

615001–615100 

|-bgcolor=#fefefe
| 615001 ||  || — || January 7, 2010 || Kitt Peak || Spacewatch ||  || align=right data-sort-value="0.79" | 790 m || 
|-id=002 bgcolor=#d6d6d6
| 615002 ||  || — || September 25, 2006 || Mount Lemmon || Mount Lemmon Survey ||  || align=right | 2.5 km || 
|-id=003 bgcolor=#E9E9E9
| 615003 ||  || — || October 14, 2001 || Apache Point || SDSS Collaboration ||  || align=right | 1.2 km || 
|-id=004 bgcolor=#E9E9E9
| 615004 ||  || — || September 17, 2010 || Kitt Peak || Spacewatch ||  || align=right | 1.4 km || 
|-id=005 bgcolor=#FA8072
| 615005 ||  || — || October 18, 2001 || Palomar || NEAT ||  || align=right | 1.7 km || 
|-id=006 bgcolor=#E9E9E9
| 615006 ||  || — || October 16, 2001 || Kitt Peak || Spacewatch ||  || align=right data-sort-value="0.88" | 880 m || 
|-id=007 bgcolor=#fefefe
| 615007 ||  || — || October 17, 2001 || Socorro || LINEAR || critical || align=right data-sort-value="0.71" | 710 m || 
|-id=008 bgcolor=#fefefe
| 615008 ||  || — || October 20, 2001 || Socorro || LINEAR ||  || align=right data-sort-value="0.68" | 680 m || 
|-id=009 bgcolor=#E9E9E9
| 615009 ||  || — || October 18, 2001 || Kitt Peak || Spacewatch ||  || align=right | 1.8 km || 
|-id=010 bgcolor=#fefefe
| 615010 ||  || — || October 20, 2001 || Kitt Peak || Spacewatch || H || align=right data-sort-value="0.44" | 440 m || 
|-id=011 bgcolor=#fefefe
| 615011 ||  || — || October 23, 2001 || Palomar || NEAT ||  || align=right data-sort-value="0.83" | 830 m || 
|-id=012 bgcolor=#E9E9E9
| 615012 ||  || — || October 18, 2001 || Palomar || NEAT ||  || align=right | 1.8 km || 
|-id=013 bgcolor=#fefefe
| 615013 ||  || — || October 20, 2001 || Socorro || LINEAR ||  || align=right data-sort-value="0.82" | 820 m || 
|-id=014 bgcolor=#E9E9E9
| 615014 ||  || — || October 21, 2001 || Socorro || LINEAR ||  || align=right | 1.4 km || 
|-id=015 bgcolor=#fefefe
| 615015 ||  || — || October 18, 2001 || Palomar || NEAT ||  || align=right data-sort-value="0.68" | 680 m || 
|-id=016 bgcolor=#fefefe
| 615016 ||  || — || October 23, 2001 || Socorro || LINEAR ||  || align=right data-sort-value="0.61" | 610 m || 
|-id=017 bgcolor=#E9E9E9
| 615017 ||  || — || August 26, 2005 || Palomar || NEAT ||  || align=right | 1.9 km || 
|-id=018 bgcolor=#fefefe
| 615018 ||  || — || July 29, 2008 || Mount Lemmon || Mount Lemmon Survey ||  || align=right data-sort-value="0.79" | 790 m || 
|-id=019 bgcolor=#d6d6d6
| 615019 ||  || — || September 18, 2001 || Apache Point || SDSS Collaboration ||  || align=right | 2.7 km || 
|-id=020 bgcolor=#fefefe
| 615020 ||  || — || September 3, 2008 || Kitt Peak || Spacewatch ||  || align=right data-sort-value="0.59" | 590 m || 
|-id=021 bgcolor=#d6d6d6
| 615021 ||  || — || November 4, 2012 || Kitt Peak || Spacewatch ||  || align=right | 2.5 km || 
|-id=022 bgcolor=#d6d6d6
| 615022 ||  || — || February 22, 2003 || Palomar || NEAT ||  || align=right | 2.6 km || 
|-id=023 bgcolor=#E9E9E9
| 615023 ||  || — || April 24, 2004 || Kitt Peak || Spacewatch ||  || align=right | 1.8 km || 
|-id=024 bgcolor=#d6d6d6
| 615024 ||  || — || January 15, 2015 || Haleakala || Pan-STARRS ||  || align=right | 2.8 km || 
|-id=025 bgcolor=#fefefe
| 615025 ||  || — || January 30, 2009 || Mount Lemmon || Mount Lemmon Survey ||  || align=right data-sort-value="0.55" | 550 m || 
|-id=026 bgcolor=#fefefe
| 615026 ||  || — || October 21, 2001 || Kitt Peak || Spacewatch ||  || align=right data-sort-value="0.58" | 580 m || 
|-id=027 bgcolor=#d6d6d6
| 615027 ||  || — || January 11, 2011 || Kitt Peak || Spacewatch || 3:2 || align=right | 2.9 km || 
|-id=028 bgcolor=#fefefe
| 615028 ||  || — || April 3, 2011 || Haleakala || Pan-STARRS ||  || align=right data-sort-value="0.55" | 550 m || 
|-id=029 bgcolor=#fefefe
| 615029 ||  || — || November 26, 2009 || Mount Lemmon || Mount Lemmon Survey ||  || align=right data-sort-value="0.60" | 600 m || 
|-id=030 bgcolor=#d6d6d6
| 615030 ||  || — || October 25, 2001 || Apache Point || SDSS Collaboration ||  || align=right | 2.1 km || 
|-id=031 bgcolor=#E9E9E9
| 615031 ||  || — || October 25, 2001 || Apache Point || SDSS Collaboration ||  || align=right | 1.8 km || 
|-id=032 bgcolor=#fefefe
| 615032 ||  || — || November 9, 2001 || Socorro || LINEAR ||  || align=right data-sort-value="0.65" | 650 m || 
|-id=033 bgcolor=#fefefe
| 615033 ||  || — || November 12, 2001 || Kitt Peak || Spacewatch ||  || align=right data-sort-value="0.67" | 670 m || 
|-id=034 bgcolor=#fefefe
| 615034 ||  || — || November 12, 2001 || Socorro || LINEAR || H || align=right data-sort-value="0.65" | 650 m || 
|-id=035 bgcolor=#E9E9E9
| 615035 ||  || — || November 11, 2001 || Kitt Peak || Spacewatch ||  || align=right | 1.7 km || 
|-id=036 bgcolor=#fefefe
| 615036 ||  || — || November 12, 2001 || Socorro || LINEAR || H || align=right data-sort-value="0.85" | 850 m || 
|-id=037 bgcolor=#fefefe
| 615037 ||  || — || March 11, 2014 || Mount Lemmon || Mount Lemmon Survey ||  || align=right data-sort-value="0.61" | 610 m || 
|-id=038 bgcolor=#E9E9E9
| 615038 ||  || — || September 25, 2009 || Mount Lemmon || Mount Lemmon Survey ||  || align=right | 1.1 km || 
|-id=039 bgcolor=#fefefe
| 615039 ||  || — || November 12, 2001 || Apache Point || SDSS Collaboration ||  || align=right data-sort-value="0.51" | 510 m || 
|-id=040 bgcolor=#fefefe
| 615040 ||  || — || November 16, 2001 || Kitt Peak || Spacewatch ||  || align=right data-sort-value="0.49" | 490 m || 
|-id=041 bgcolor=#fefefe
| 615041 ||  || — || November 20, 2001 || Socorro || LINEAR || H || align=right data-sort-value="0.81" | 810 m || 
|-id=042 bgcolor=#E9E9E9
| 615042 ||  || — || September 20, 2001 || Socorro || LINEAR ||  || align=right | 2.0 km || 
|-id=043 bgcolor=#fefefe
| 615043 ||  || — || October 10, 2001 || Kitt Peak || Spacewatch ||  || align=right data-sort-value="0.75" | 750 m || 
|-id=044 bgcolor=#fefefe
| 615044 ||  || — || October 18, 2001 || Kitt Peak || Spacewatch ||  || align=right data-sort-value="0.89" | 890 m || 
|-id=045 bgcolor=#fefefe
| 615045 ||  || — || October 11, 2001 || Palomar || NEAT ||  || align=right data-sort-value="0.73" | 730 m || 
|-id=046 bgcolor=#fefefe
| 615046 ||  || — || August 12, 2012 || Siding Spring || SSS ||  || align=right data-sort-value="0.63" | 630 m || 
|-id=047 bgcolor=#fefefe
| 615047 ||  || — || November 26, 2005 || Mount Lemmon || Mount Lemmon Survey ||  || align=right data-sort-value="0.59" | 590 m || 
|-id=048 bgcolor=#E9E9E9
| 615048 ||  || — || March 29, 2003 || Anderson Mesa || LONEOS ||  || align=right | 2.5 km || 
|-id=049 bgcolor=#fefefe
| 615049 ||  || — || October 1, 2005 || Mount Lemmon || Mount Lemmon Survey ||  || align=right data-sort-value="0.77" | 770 m || 
|-id=050 bgcolor=#fefefe
| 615050 ||  || — || November 17, 2001 || Kitt Peak || Spacewatch ||  || align=right data-sort-value="0.48" | 480 m || 
|-id=051 bgcolor=#fefefe
| 615051 ||  || — || October 16, 2012 || Kitt Peak || Spacewatch ||  || align=right data-sort-value="0.65" | 650 m || 
|-id=052 bgcolor=#C2FFFF
| 615052 ||  || — || September 3, 2013 || Kitt Peak || Spacewatch || L5 || align=right | 9.6 km || 
|-id=053 bgcolor=#FA8072
| 615053 ||  || — || December 11, 2001 || Socorro || LINEAR ||  || align=right data-sort-value="0.75" | 750 m || 
|-id=054 bgcolor=#d6d6d6
| 615054 ||  || — || December 11, 2001 || Socorro || LINEAR ||  || align=right | 3.3 km || 
|-id=055 bgcolor=#fefefe
| 615055 ||  || — || December 14, 2001 || Socorro || LINEAR || H || align=right data-sort-value="0.60" | 600 m || 
|-id=056 bgcolor=#fefefe
| 615056 ||  || — || December 15, 2001 || Socorro || LINEAR || H || align=right data-sort-value="0.64" | 640 m || 
|-id=057 bgcolor=#fefefe
| 615057 ||  || — || September 24, 2012 || Kitt Peak || Spacewatch ||  || align=right data-sort-value="0.88" | 880 m || 
|-id=058 bgcolor=#E9E9E9
| 615058 ||  || — || March 20, 2017 || Haleakala || Pan-STARRS ||  || align=right | 2.0 km || 
|-id=059 bgcolor=#d6d6d6
| 615059 ||  || — || December 13, 2013 || Mount Lemmon || Mount Lemmon Survey ||  || align=right | 2.5 km || 
|-id=060 bgcolor=#fefefe
| 615060 ||  || — || December 17, 2001 || Socorro || LINEAR || H || align=right data-sort-value="0.77" | 770 m || 
|-id=061 bgcolor=#fefefe
| 615061 ||  || — || December 17, 2001 || Socorro || LINEAR ||  || align=right data-sort-value="0.69" | 690 m || 
|-id=062 bgcolor=#E9E9E9
| 615062 ||  || — || December 18, 2001 || Socorro || LINEAR ||  || align=right | 1.7 km || 
|-id=063 bgcolor=#fefefe
| 615063 ||  || — || December 19, 2001 || Kitt Peak || Spacewatch ||  || align=right data-sort-value="0.57" | 570 m || 
|-id=064 bgcolor=#fefefe
| 615064 ||  || — || January 9, 2002 || Socorro || LINEAR || H || align=right data-sort-value="0.85" | 850 m || 
|-id=065 bgcolor=#fefefe
| 615065 ||  || — || January 13, 2002 || Socorro || LINEAR ||  || align=right | 1.2 km || 
|-id=066 bgcolor=#fefefe
| 615066 ||  || — || January 14, 2002 || Socorro || LINEAR ||  || align=right data-sort-value="0.83" | 830 m || 
|-id=067 bgcolor=#fefefe
| 615067 ||  || — || March 3, 2013 || Mount Lemmon || Mount Lemmon Survey ||  || align=right data-sort-value="0.53" | 530 m || 
|-id=068 bgcolor=#E9E9E9
| 615068 ||  || — || October 25, 2009 || Mount Lemmon || Mount Lemmon Survey ||  || align=right | 1.5 km || 
|-id=069 bgcolor=#E9E9E9
| 615069 ||  || — || July 23, 2009 || Siding Spring || SSS ||  || align=right | 2.4 km || 
|-id=070 bgcolor=#d6d6d6
| 615070 ||  || — || January 22, 2002 || Kitt Peak || Spacewatch ||  || align=right | 1.8 km || 
|-id=071 bgcolor=#fefefe
| 615071 ||  || — || February 10, 2002 || Socorro || LINEAR ||  || align=right data-sort-value="0.69" | 690 m || 
|-id=072 bgcolor=#fefefe
| 615072 ||  || — || February 10, 2002 || Kitt Peak || Spacewatch ||  || align=right data-sort-value="0.85" | 850 m || 
|-id=073 bgcolor=#fefefe
| 615073 ||  || — || February 11, 2002 || Socorro || LINEAR ||  || align=right data-sort-value="0.67" | 670 m || 
|-id=074 bgcolor=#E9E9E9
| 615074 ||  || — || February 9, 2002 || Kitt Peak || Spacewatch ||  || align=right | 1.8 km || 
|-id=075 bgcolor=#d6d6d6
| 615075 ||  || — || April 21, 2013 || Haleakala || Pan-STARRS ||  || align=right | 3.0 km || 
|-id=076 bgcolor=#fefefe
| 615076 ||  || — || March 7, 1995 || Kitt Peak || Spacewatch ||  || align=right data-sort-value="0.54" | 540 m || 
|-id=077 bgcolor=#fefefe
| 615077 ||  || — || November 2, 2007 || Mount Lemmon || Mount Lemmon Survey ||  || align=right data-sort-value="0.66" | 660 m || 
|-id=078 bgcolor=#fefefe
| 615078 ||  || — || October 31, 2013 || Kitt Peak || Spacewatch ||  || align=right data-sort-value="0.50" | 500 m || 
|-id=079 bgcolor=#d6d6d6
| 615079 ||  || — || February 13, 2002 || Kitt Peak || Spacewatch ||  || align=right | 1.6 km || 
|-id=080 bgcolor=#fefefe
| 615080 ||  || — || August 13, 2012 || Haleakala || Pan-STARRS ||  || align=right data-sort-value="0.62" | 620 m || 
|-id=081 bgcolor=#fefefe
| 615081 ||  || — || September 6, 2016 || Mount Lemmon || Mount Lemmon Survey ||  || align=right data-sort-value="0.52" | 520 m || 
|-id=082 bgcolor=#fefefe
| 615082 ||  || — || February 17, 2002 || Cerro Tololo || A. C. Becker ||  || align=right data-sort-value="0.71" | 710 m || 
|-id=083 bgcolor=#d6d6d6
| 615083 ||  || — || February 20, 2002 || Anderson Mesa || LONEOS ||  || align=right | 2.8 km || 
|-id=084 bgcolor=#d6d6d6
| 615084 ||  || — || March 9, 2002 || Kitt Peak || Spacewatch ||  || align=right | 1.8 km || 
|-id=085 bgcolor=#d6d6d6
| 615085 ||  || — || March 11, 2002 || Kitt Peak || Spacewatch ||  || align=right | 2.1 km || 
|-id=086 bgcolor=#fefefe
| 615086 ||  || — || January 19, 2013 || Mount Lemmon || Mount Lemmon Survey ||  || align=right data-sort-value="0.80" | 800 m || 
|-id=087 bgcolor=#fefefe
| 615087 ||  || — || March 9, 2002 || Palomar || NEAT ||  || align=right data-sort-value="0.57" | 570 m || 
|-id=088 bgcolor=#fefefe
| 615088 ||  || — || December 4, 2012 || Mount Lemmon || Mount Lemmon Survey ||  || align=right data-sort-value="0.75" | 750 m || 
|-id=089 bgcolor=#fefefe
| 615089 ||  || — || September 21, 2003 || Kitt Peak || Spacewatch ||  || align=right data-sort-value="0.57" | 570 m || 
|-id=090 bgcolor=#d6d6d6
| 615090 ||  || — || August 25, 2014 || Haleakala || Pan-STARRS ||  || align=right | 1.8 km || 
|-id=091 bgcolor=#d6d6d6
| 615091 ||  || — || September 24, 2011 || Haleakala || Pan-STARRS || Tj (2.98) || align=right | 2.8 km || 
|-id=092 bgcolor=#fefefe
| 615092 ||  || — || January 13, 2008 || Kitt Peak || Spacewatch ||  || align=right data-sort-value="0.59" | 590 m || 
|-id=093 bgcolor=#d6d6d6
| 615093 ||  || — || September 29, 1994 || Kitt Peak || Spacewatch ||  || align=right | 2.4 km || 
|-id=094 bgcolor=#fefefe
| 615094 ||  || — || February 21, 2009 || Catalina || CSS ||  || align=right data-sort-value="0.68" | 680 m || 
|-id=095 bgcolor=#E9E9E9
| 615095 ||  || — || March 6, 2011 || Mount Lemmon || Mount Lemmon Survey ||  || align=right | 1.5 km || 
|-id=096 bgcolor=#E9E9E9
| 615096 ||  || — || May 6, 2006 || Mount Lemmon || Mount Lemmon Survey ||  || align=right data-sort-value="0.91" | 910 m || 
|-id=097 bgcolor=#E9E9E9
| 615097 ||  || — || April 8, 2010 || Kitt Peak || Spacewatch ||  || align=right data-sort-value="0.73" | 730 m || 
|-id=098 bgcolor=#E9E9E9
| 615098 ||  || — || May 4, 2002 || Kitt Peak || Spacewatch ||  || align=right data-sort-value="0.79" | 790 m || 
|-id=099 bgcolor=#d6d6d6
| 615099 ||  || — || October 16, 2003 || Kitt Peak || Spacewatch ||  || align=right | 2.7 km || 
|-id=100 bgcolor=#fefefe
| 615100 ||  || — || February 5, 2009 || Kitt Peak || Spacewatch || critical || align=right data-sort-value="0.60" | 600 m || 
|}

615101–615200 

|-bgcolor=#fefefe
| 615101 ||  || — || June 5, 2002 || Kitt Peak || Spacewatch ||  || align=right data-sort-value="0.80" | 800 m || 
|-id=102 bgcolor=#fefefe
| 615102 ||  || — || May 12, 2002 || Palomar || NEAT ||  || align=right data-sort-value="0.68" | 680 m || 
|-id=103 bgcolor=#E9E9E9
| 615103 ||  || — || April 14, 2010 || Kitt Peak || Spacewatch ||  || align=right data-sort-value="0.92" | 920 m || 
|-id=104 bgcolor=#E9E9E9
| 615104 ||  || — || June 15, 2002 || Palomar || NEAT ||  || align=right data-sort-value="0.91" | 910 m || 
|-id=105 bgcolor=#E9E9E9
| 615105 ||  || — || August 13, 2002 || Palomar || NEAT ||  || align=right data-sort-value="0.96" | 960 m || 
|-id=106 bgcolor=#E9E9E9
| 615106 ||  || — || February 3, 2009 || Mount Lemmon || Mount Lemmon Survey ||  || align=right | 1.5 km || 
|-id=107 bgcolor=#fefefe
| 615107 ||  || — || April 4, 2005 || Mount Lemmon || Mount Lemmon Survey ||  || align=right data-sort-value="0.56" | 560 m || 
|-id=108 bgcolor=#d6d6d6
| 615108 ||  || — || June 2, 2002 || Palomar || NEAT ||  || align=right | 2.8 km || 
|-id=109 bgcolor=#E9E9E9
| 615109 ||  || — || June 26, 2002 || Palomar || NEAT ||  || align=right | 2.4 km || 
|-id=110 bgcolor=#E9E9E9
| 615110 ||  || — || August 5, 2002 || Palomar || NEAT ||  || align=right data-sort-value="0.65" | 650 m || 
|-id=111 bgcolor=#fefefe
| 615111 ||  || — || January 21, 2015 || Haleakala || Pan-STARRS ||  || align=right data-sort-value="0.64" | 640 m || 
|-id=112 bgcolor=#fefefe
| 615112 ||  || — || July 14, 2002 || Palomar || NEAT ||  || align=right data-sort-value="0.53" | 530 m || 
|-id=113 bgcolor=#E9E9E9
| 615113 ||  || — || July 14, 2002 || Palomar || NEAT ||  || align=right | 1.5 km || 
|-id=114 bgcolor=#E9E9E9
| 615114 ||  || — || July 5, 2002 || Kitt Peak || Spacewatch ||  || align=right data-sort-value="0.92" | 920 m || 
|-id=115 bgcolor=#d6d6d6
| 615115 ||  || — || October 10, 2008 || Catalina || CSS ||  || align=right | 2.9 km || 
|-id=116 bgcolor=#d6d6d6
| 615116 ||  || — || December 18, 2003 || Kitt Peak || Spacewatch ||  || align=right | 3.1 km || 
|-id=117 bgcolor=#d6d6d6
| 615117 ||  || — || October 24, 2003 || Apache Point || SDSS Collaboration ||  || align=right | 2.9 km || 
|-id=118 bgcolor=#d6d6d6
| 615118 ||  || — || January 12, 2010 || Mount Lemmon || Mount Lemmon Survey ||  || align=right | 3.5 km || 
|-id=119 bgcolor=#d6d6d6
| 615119 ||  || — || November 2, 2008 || Catalina || CSS ||  || align=right | 2.9 km || 
|-id=120 bgcolor=#E9E9E9
| 615120 ||  || — || June 18, 2002 || Campo Imperatore || CINEOS ||  || align=right data-sort-value="0.97" | 970 m || 
|-id=121 bgcolor=#d6d6d6
| 615121 ||  || — || September 23, 2008 || Kitt Peak || Spacewatch ||  || align=right | 2.2 km || 
|-id=122 bgcolor=#fefefe
| 615122 ||  || — || August 27, 2009 || Kitt Peak || Spacewatch ||  || align=right data-sort-value="0.56" | 560 m || 
|-id=123 bgcolor=#fefefe
| 615123 ||  || — || February 8, 2011 || Mount Lemmon || Mount Lemmon Survey ||  || align=right data-sort-value="0.70" | 700 m || 
|-id=124 bgcolor=#E9E9E9
| 615124 ||  || — || December 16, 2007 || Kitt Peak || Spacewatch ||  || align=right data-sort-value="0.99" | 990 m || 
|-id=125 bgcolor=#fefefe
| 615125 ||  || — || February 2, 2009 || Kitt Peak || Spacewatch ||  || align=right data-sort-value="0.99" | 990 m || 
|-id=126 bgcolor=#FA8072
| 615126 ||  || — || October 18, 2009 || Mount Lemmon || Mount Lemmon Survey ||  || align=right data-sort-value="0.51" | 510 m || 
|-id=127 bgcolor=#d6d6d6
| 615127 ||  || — || September 9, 2013 || Haleakala || Pan-STARRS ||  || align=right | 2.0 km || 
|-id=128 bgcolor=#E9E9E9
| 615128 ||  || — || July 14, 2002 || Palomar || NEAT ||  || align=right data-sort-value="0.86" | 860 m || 
|-id=129 bgcolor=#E9E9E9
| 615129 ||  || — || January 16, 2005 || Kitt Peak || Spacewatch ||  || align=right | 1.1 km || 
|-id=130 bgcolor=#E9E9E9
| 615130 ||  || — || July 21, 2002 || Palomar || NEAT ||  || align=right | 1.1 km || 
|-id=131 bgcolor=#E9E9E9
| 615131 ||  || — || September 10, 2007 || Mount Lemmon || Mount Lemmon Survey || critical || align=right | 1.3 km || 
|-id=132 bgcolor=#E9E9E9
| 615132 ||  || — || December 18, 2007 || Mount Lemmon || Mount Lemmon Survey ||  || align=right data-sort-value="0.99" | 990 m || 
|-id=133 bgcolor=#E9E9E9
| 615133 ||  || — || February 12, 2004 || Kitt Peak || Spacewatch ||  || align=right | 1.4 km || 
|-id=134 bgcolor=#d6d6d6
| 615134 ||  || — || October 26, 2008 || Mount Lemmon || Mount Lemmon Survey ||  || align=right | 2.3 km || 
|-id=135 bgcolor=#E9E9E9
| 615135 ||  || — || August 24, 2002 || Palomar || NEAT ||  || align=right | 1.7 km || 
|-id=136 bgcolor=#E9E9E9
| 615136 ||  || — || July 21, 2002 || Palomar || NEAT ||  || align=right | 1.0 km || 
|-id=137 bgcolor=#d6d6d6
| 615137 ||  || — || October 28, 2008 || Kitt Peak || Spacewatch ||  || align=right | 2.1 km || 
|-id=138 bgcolor=#d6d6d6
| 615138 ||  || — || July 8, 2002 || Palomar || NEAT ||  || align=right | 3.8 km || 
|-id=139 bgcolor=#E9E9E9
| 615139 ||  || — || August 3, 2002 || Palomar || NEAT ||  || align=right data-sort-value="0.98" | 980 m || 
|-id=140 bgcolor=#E9E9E9
| 615140 ||  || — || June 24, 2002 || Palomar || NEAT ||  || align=right | 1.1 km || 
|-id=141 bgcolor=#fefefe
| 615141 ||  || — || August 6, 2002 || Palomar || NEAT ||  || align=right data-sort-value="0.64" | 640 m || 
|-id=142 bgcolor=#E9E9E9
| 615142 ||  || — || August 6, 2002 || Palomar || NEAT ||  || align=right data-sort-value="0.94" | 940 m || 
|-id=143 bgcolor=#E9E9E9
| 615143 ||  || — || June 18, 2002 || Kitt Peak || Spacewatch ||  || align=right data-sort-value="0.66" | 660 m || 
|-id=144 bgcolor=#E9E9E9
| 615144 ||  || — || July 17, 2002 || Palomar || NEAT ||  || align=right data-sort-value="0.85" | 850 m || 
|-id=145 bgcolor=#E9E9E9
| 615145 ||  || — || July 21, 2002 || Palomar || NEAT ||  || align=right | 1.6 km || 
|-id=146 bgcolor=#E9E9E9
| 615146 ||  || — || July 20, 2002 || Palomar || NEAT ||  || align=right data-sort-value="0.84" | 840 m || 
|-id=147 bgcolor=#fefefe
| 615147 ||  || — || August 13, 2002 || Socorro || LINEAR ||  || align=right data-sort-value="0.58" | 580 m || 
|-id=148 bgcolor=#E9E9E9
| 615148 ||  || — || August 6, 2002 || Palomar || NEAT ||  || align=right | 1.3 km || 
|-id=149 bgcolor=#E9E9E9
| 615149 ||  || — || August 8, 2002 || Palomar || NEAT ||  || align=right | 1.1 km || 
|-id=150 bgcolor=#d6d6d6
| 615150 ||  || — || July 14, 2002 || Palomar || NEAT ||  || align=right | 2.5 km || 
|-id=151 bgcolor=#E9E9E9
| 615151 ||  || — || July 23, 2002 || Palomar || NEAT ||  || align=right | 1.2 km || 
|-id=152 bgcolor=#fefefe
| 615152 ||  || — || August 8, 2002 || Powell || Powell Obs. ||  || align=right data-sort-value="0.50" | 500 m || 
|-id=153 bgcolor=#d6d6d6
| 615153 ||  || — || August 8, 2002 || Palomar || NEAT ||  || align=right | 3.2 km || 
|-id=154 bgcolor=#d6d6d6
| 615154 ||  || — || November 26, 2003 || Nogales || P. R. Holvorcem, M. Schwartz ||  || align=right | 3.2 km || 
|-id=155 bgcolor=#E9E9E9
| 615155 ||  || — || July 14, 2002 || Palomar || NEAT ||  || align=right data-sort-value="0.85" | 850 m || 
|-id=156 bgcolor=#fefefe
| 615156 ||  || — || August 12, 2002 || Haleakala || AMOS ||  || align=right data-sort-value="0.57" | 570 m || 
|-id=157 bgcolor=#E9E9E9
| 615157 ||  || — || August 16, 2002 || Haleakala || AMOS ||  || align=right data-sort-value="0.87" | 870 m || 
|-id=158 bgcolor=#E9E9E9
| 615158 ||  || — || December 5, 2007 || Mount Lemmon || Mount Lemmon Survey ||  || align=right data-sort-value="0.77" | 770 m || 
|-id=159 bgcolor=#E9E9E9
| 615159 ||  || — || February 20, 2009 || Kitt Peak || Spacewatch ||  || align=right data-sort-value="0.98" | 980 m || 
|-id=160 bgcolor=#d6d6d6
| 615160 ||  || — || February 9, 2010 || Mount Lemmon || Mount Lemmon Survey ||  || align=right | 2.5 km || 
|-id=161 bgcolor=#E9E9E9
| 615161 ||  || — || March 25, 2009 || Mount Lemmon || Mount Lemmon Survey ||  || align=right | 1.8 km || 
|-id=162 bgcolor=#fefefe
| 615162 ||  || — || December 13, 2006 || Mount Lemmon || Mount Lemmon Survey ||  || align=right data-sort-value="0.63" | 630 m || 
|-id=163 bgcolor=#fefefe
| 615163 ||  || — || October 11, 2002 || Apache Point || SDSS Collaboration ||  || align=right data-sort-value="0.70" | 700 m || 
|-id=164 bgcolor=#d6d6d6
| 615164 ||  || — || January 8, 2010 || Kitt Peak || Spacewatch ||  || align=right | 2.8 km || 
|-id=165 bgcolor=#E9E9E9
| 615165 ||  || — || August 12, 2002 || Anderson Mesa || LONEOS ||  || align=right | 1.4 km || 
|-id=166 bgcolor=#E9E9E9
| 615166 ||  || — || July 12, 2002 || Palomar || NEAT ||  || align=right data-sort-value="0.60" | 600 m || 
|-id=167 bgcolor=#fefefe
| 615167 ||  || — || August 20, 2009 || Kitt Peak || Spacewatch ||  || align=right data-sort-value="0.69" | 690 m || 
|-id=168 bgcolor=#d6d6d6
| 615168 ||  || — || March 3, 2006 || Kitt Peak || Spacewatch ||  || align=right | 2.7 km || 
|-id=169 bgcolor=#fefefe
| 615169 ||  || — || November 22, 2009 || Catalina || CSS ||  || align=right data-sort-value="0.57" | 570 m || 
|-id=170 bgcolor=#E9E9E9
| 615170 ||  || — || January 18, 2009 || Kitt Peak || Spacewatch ||  || align=right data-sort-value="0.95" | 950 m || 
|-id=171 bgcolor=#fefefe
| 615171 ||  || — || November 13, 2006 || Mount Lemmon || Mount Lemmon Survey ||  || align=right data-sort-value="0.51" | 510 m || 
|-id=172 bgcolor=#E9E9E9
| 615172 ||  || — || November 26, 2011 || Mount Lemmon || Mount Lemmon Survey ||  || align=right data-sort-value="0.84" | 840 m || 
|-id=173 bgcolor=#FA8072
| 615173 ||  || — || November 17, 2009 || Mount Lemmon || Mount Lemmon Survey ||  || align=right data-sort-value="0.45" | 450 m || 
|-id=174 bgcolor=#d6d6d6
| 615174 ||  || — || September 1, 2002 || Palomar || NEAT ||  || align=right | 2.4 km || 
|-id=175 bgcolor=#E9E9E9
| 615175 ||  || — || September 3, 2002 || Palomar || NEAT || critical || align=right | 1.8 km || 
|-id=176 bgcolor=#E9E9E9
| 615176 ||  || — || July 25, 2015 || Haleakala || Pan-STARRS ||  || align=right | 1.1 km || 
|-id=177 bgcolor=#fefefe
| 615177 ||  || — || August 3, 2002 || Palomar || NEAT ||  || align=right data-sort-value="0.51" | 510 m || 
|-id=178 bgcolor=#E9E9E9
| 615178 ||  || — || February 16, 2004 || Kitt Peak || Spacewatch ||  || align=right | 1.8 km || 
|-id=179 bgcolor=#fefefe
| 615179 ||  || — || January 19, 2015 || Haleakala || Pan-STARRS ||  || align=right data-sort-value="0.68" | 680 m || 
|-id=180 bgcolor=#E9E9E9
| 615180 ||  || — || July 1, 2011 || Mount Lemmon || Mount Lemmon Survey ||  || align=right | 2.1 km || 
|-id=181 bgcolor=#d6d6d6
| 615181 ||  || — || August 16, 2002 || Palomar || NEAT ||  || align=right | 2.1 km || 
|-id=182 bgcolor=#E9E9E9
| 615182 ||  || — || August 28, 2002 || Palomar || NEAT ||  || align=right | 1.5 km || 
|-id=183 bgcolor=#fefefe
| 615183 ||  || — || August 30, 2002 || Kitt Peak || Spacewatch ||  || align=right data-sort-value="0.62" | 620 m || 
|-id=184 bgcolor=#E9E9E9
| 615184 ||  || — || August 11, 2002 || Palomar || NEAT ||  || align=right | 1.2 km || 
|-id=185 bgcolor=#d6d6d6
| 615185 ||  || — || August 20, 2002 || Palomar || NEAT ||  || align=right | 3.4 km || 
|-id=186 bgcolor=#fefefe
| 615186 ||  || — || August 17, 2002 || Palomar || NEAT ||  || align=right data-sort-value="0.62" | 620 m || 
|-id=187 bgcolor=#fefefe
| 615187 ||  || — || August 18, 2002 || Palomar || NEAT ||  || align=right data-sort-value="0.90" | 900 m || 
|-id=188 bgcolor=#fefefe
| 615188 ||  || — || August 18, 2002 || Palomar || NEAT ||  || align=right data-sort-value="0.83" | 830 m || 
|-id=189 bgcolor=#d6d6d6
| 615189 ||  || — || August 8, 2002 || Palomar || NEAT ||  || align=right | 2.5 km || 
|-id=190 bgcolor=#d6d6d6
| 615190 ||  || — || August 14, 2002 || Palomar || NEAT ||  || align=right | 2.8 km || 
|-id=191 bgcolor=#E9E9E9
| 615191 ||  || — || August 17, 2002 || Palomar || NEAT ||  || align=right data-sort-value="0.96" | 960 m || 
|-id=192 bgcolor=#fefefe
| 615192 ||  || — || August 17, 2002 || Palomar || NEAT ||  || align=right data-sort-value="0.62" | 620 m || 
|-id=193 bgcolor=#fefefe
| 615193 ||  || — || August 17, 2002 || Palomar || NEAT || H || align=right data-sort-value="0.42" | 420 m || 
|-id=194 bgcolor=#fefefe
| 615194 ||  || — || August 18, 2002 || Palomar || NEAT ||  || align=right data-sort-value="0.70" | 700 m || 
|-id=195 bgcolor=#E9E9E9
| 615195 ||  || — || August 17, 2002 || Palomar || NEAT ||  || align=right | 1.5 km || 
|-id=196 bgcolor=#E9E9E9
| 615196 ||  || — || August 19, 2002 || Palomar || NEAT ||  || align=right | 1.8 km || 
|-id=197 bgcolor=#fefefe
| 615197 ||  || — || May 10, 2005 || Kitt Peak || Spacewatch ||  || align=right data-sort-value="0.44" | 440 m || 
|-id=198 bgcolor=#FA8072
| 615198 ||  || — || July 12, 2002 || Palomar || NEAT ||  || align=right data-sort-value="0.43" | 430 m || 
|-id=199 bgcolor=#d6d6d6
| 615199 ||  || — || August 11, 2002 || Palomar || NEAT ||  || align=right | 2.5 km || 
|-id=200 bgcolor=#fefefe
| 615200 ||  || — || March 17, 2004 || Kitt Peak || Spacewatch ||  || align=right data-sort-value="0.68" | 680 m || 
|}

615201–615300 

|-bgcolor=#fefefe
| 615201 ||  || — || June 16, 2005 || Kitt Peak || Spacewatch ||  || align=right data-sort-value="0.73" | 730 m || 
|-id=202 bgcolor=#fefefe
| 615202 ||  || — || August 19, 2002 || Palomar || NEAT ||  || align=right data-sort-value="0.61" | 610 m || 
|-id=203 bgcolor=#E9E9E9
| 615203 ||  || — || April 12, 2005 || Mount Lemmon || Mount Lemmon Survey ||  || align=right | 1.1 km || 
|-id=204 bgcolor=#E9E9E9
| 615204 ||  || — || August 18, 2002 || Palomar || NEAT ||  || align=right | 1.0 km || 
|-id=205 bgcolor=#E9E9E9
| 615205 ||  || — || August 12, 2002 || Cerro Tololo || M. W. Buie, S. D. Kern ||  || align=right data-sort-value="0.81" | 810 m || 
|-id=206 bgcolor=#E9E9E9
| 615206 ||  || — || August 19, 2002 || Palomar || NEAT ||  || align=right | 1.1 km || 
|-id=207 bgcolor=#E9E9E9
| 615207 ||  || — || August 6, 2002 || Palomar || NEAT ||  || align=right | 1.4 km || 
|-id=208 bgcolor=#fefefe
| 615208 ||  || — || July 22, 2002 || Palomar || NEAT ||  || align=right data-sort-value="0.65" | 650 m || 
|-id=209 bgcolor=#E9E9E9
| 615209 ||  || — || June 19, 2006 || Mount Lemmon || Mount Lemmon Survey ||  || align=right | 1.1 km || 
|-id=210 bgcolor=#E9E9E9
| 615210 ||  || — || July 12, 2002 || Palomar || NEAT ||  || align=right | 1.5 km || 
|-id=211 bgcolor=#E9E9E9
| 615211 ||  || — || August 8, 2002 || Palomar || NEAT ||  || align=right data-sort-value="0.81" | 810 m || 
|-id=212 bgcolor=#fefefe
| 615212 ||  || — || August 29, 2002 || Palomar || NEAT ||  || align=right data-sort-value="0.58" | 580 m || 
|-id=213 bgcolor=#d6d6d6
| 615213 ||  || — || January 16, 2005 || Kitt Peak || Spacewatch ||  || align=right | 2.8 km || 
|-id=214 bgcolor=#E9E9E9
| 615214 ||  || — || August 17, 2002 || Palomar || NEAT ||  || align=right data-sort-value="0.61" | 610 m || 
|-id=215 bgcolor=#fefefe
| 615215 ||  || — || August 29, 2002 || Palomar || NEAT ||  || align=right data-sort-value="0.52" | 520 m || 
|-id=216 bgcolor=#d6d6d6
| 615216 ||  || — || October 31, 2008 || Mount Lemmon || Mount Lemmon Survey ||  || align=right | 2.5 km || 
|-id=217 bgcolor=#d6d6d6
| 615217 ||  || — || November 1, 2008 || Mount Lemmon || Mount Lemmon Survey ||  || align=right | 2.6 km || 
|-id=218 bgcolor=#fefefe
| 615218 ||  || — || March 3, 2005 || Catalina || CSS ||  || align=right | 1.1 km || 
|-id=219 bgcolor=#d6d6d6
| 615219 ||  || — || April 26, 2006 || Kitt Peak || Spacewatch ||  || align=right | 2.5 km || 
|-id=220 bgcolor=#E9E9E9
| 615220 ||  || — || January 28, 2004 || Apache Point || SDSS Collaboration ||  || align=right | 1.3 km || 
|-id=221 bgcolor=#fefefe
| 615221 ||  || — || August 20, 2009 || La Sagra || OAM Obs. ||  || align=right data-sort-value="0.63" | 630 m || 
|-id=222 bgcolor=#d6d6d6
| 615222 ||  || — || November 8, 2008 || Mount Lemmon || Mount Lemmon Survey ||  || align=right | 2.5 km || 
|-id=223 bgcolor=#E9E9E9
| 615223 ||  || — || July 10, 2002 || Palomar || NEAT ||  || align=right data-sort-value="0.84" | 840 m || 
|-id=224 bgcolor=#d6d6d6
| 615224 ||  || — || September 5, 2013 || Catalina || CSS ||  || align=right | 2.5 km || 
|-id=225 bgcolor=#fefefe
| 615225 ||  || — || August 17, 2009 || Kitt Peak || Spacewatch ||  || align=right data-sort-value="0.91" | 910 m || 
|-id=226 bgcolor=#fefefe
| 615226 ||  || — || November 22, 2006 || Catalina || CSS ||  || align=right data-sort-value="0.88" | 880 m || 
|-id=227 bgcolor=#fefefe
| 615227 ||  || — || August 30, 2002 || Kitt Peak || Spacewatch ||  || align=right data-sort-value="0.48" | 480 m || 
|-id=228 bgcolor=#d6d6d6
| 615228 ||  || — || October 25, 2008 || Kitt Peak || Spacewatch ||  || align=right | 2.4 km || 
|-id=229 bgcolor=#E9E9E9
| 615229 ||  || — || January 28, 2017 || Haleakala || Pan-STARRS ||  || align=right data-sort-value="0.83" | 830 m || 
|-id=230 bgcolor=#fefefe
| 615230 ||  || — || September 4, 2002 || Anderson Mesa || LONEOS ||  || align=right data-sort-value="0.87" | 870 m || 
|-id=231 bgcolor=#E9E9E9
| 615231 ||  || — || September 3, 2002 || Palomar || NEAT ||  || align=right | 1.5 km || 
|-id=232 bgcolor=#E9E9E9
| 615232 ||  || — || September 3, 2002 || Palomar || NEAT ||  || align=right | 2.0 km || 
|-id=233 bgcolor=#fefefe
| 615233 ||  || — || July 22, 2002 || Palomar || NEAT ||  || align=right | 1.0 km || 
|-id=234 bgcolor=#d6d6d6
| 615234 ||  || — || October 3, 1997 || Kitt Peak || Spacewatch ||  || align=right | 2.2 km || 
|-id=235 bgcolor=#fefefe
| 615235 ||  || — || September 5, 2002 || Socorro || LINEAR ||  || align=right data-sort-value="0.80" | 800 m || 
|-id=236 bgcolor=#fefefe
| 615236 ||  || — || September 13, 2002 || Socorro || LINEAR ||  || align=right data-sort-value="0.85" | 850 m || 
|-id=237 bgcolor=#E9E9E9
| 615237 ||  || — || September 5, 2002 || Socorro || LINEAR ||  || align=right data-sort-value="0.78" | 780 m || 
|-id=238 bgcolor=#d6d6d6
| 615238 ||  || — || September 12, 2002 || Palomar || NEAT ||  || align=right | 2.6 km || 
|-id=239 bgcolor=#d6d6d6
| 615239 ||  || — || September 14, 2002 || Palomar || NEAT ||  || align=right | 2.5 km || 
|-id=240 bgcolor=#E9E9E9
| 615240 ||  || — || September 14, 2002 || Palomar || NEAT ||  || align=right | 1.2 km || 
|-id=241 bgcolor=#d6d6d6
| 615241 ||  || — || September 15, 2002 || Kitt Peak || Spacewatch ||  || align=right | 2.2 km || 
|-id=242 bgcolor=#fefefe
| 615242 ||  || — || September 13, 2002 || Socorro || LINEAR ||  || align=right data-sort-value="0.86" | 860 m || 
|-id=243 bgcolor=#fefefe
| 615243 ||  || — || September 5, 2002 || Socorro || LINEAR ||  || align=right data-sort-value="0.74" | 740 m || 
|-id=244 bgcolor=#fefefe
| 615244 ||  || — || February 14, 2000 || Kitt Peak || Spacewatch ||  || align=right data-sort-value="0.86" | 860 m || 
|-id=245 bgcolor=#d6d6d6
| 615245 ||  || — || September 13, 2002 || Palomar || NEAT ||  || align=right | 3.0 km || 
|-id=246 bgcolor=#fefefe
| 615246 ||  || — || September 15, 2002 || Haleakala || AMOS ||  || align=right data-sort-value="0.75" | 750 m || 
|-id=247 bgcolor=#fefefe
| 615247 ||  || — || August 29, 2002 || Palomar || NEAT ||  || align=right data-sort-value="0.59" | 590 m || 
|-id=248 bgcolor=#d6d6d6
| 615248 ||  || — || August 28, 2002 || Palomar || NEAT ||  || align=right | 2.2 km || 
|-id=249 bgcolor=#d6d6d6
| 615249 ||  || — || September 6, 2002 || Socorro || LINEAR ||  || align=right | 2.5 km || 
|-id=250 bgcolor=#fefefe
| 615250 ||  || — || September 9, 2002 || Haleakala || AMOS ||  || align=right data-sort-value="0.82" | 820 m || 
|-id=251 bgcolor=#E9E9E9
| 615251 ||  || — || August 18, 2002 || Palomar || NEAT ||  || align=right | 1.9 km || 
|-id=252 bgcolor=#d6d6d6
| 615252 ||  || — || September 12, 2002 || Palomar || NEAT ||  || align=right | 2.8 km || 
|-id=253 bgcolor=#d6d6d6
| 615253 ||  || — || February 9, 2005 || Kitt Peak || Spacewatch ||  || align=right | 2.7 km || 
|-id=254 bgcolor=#d6d6d6
| 615254 ||  || — || April 30, 2006 || Kitt Peak || Spacewatch ||  || align=right | 2.0 km || 
|-id=255 bgcolor=#E9E9E9
| 615255 ||  || — || September 11, 2002 || Palomar || NEAT ||  || align=right | 1.4 km || 
|-id=256 bgcolor=#E9E9E9
| 615256 ||  || — || August 18, 2002 || Palomar || NEAT ||  || align=right | 1.1 km || 
|-id=257 bgcolor=#E9E9E9
| 615257 ||  || — || July 29, 2002 || Palomar || NEAT ||  || align=right | 1.6 km || 
|-id=258 bgcolor=#d6d6d6
| 615258 ||  || — || October 27, 2008 || Kitt Peak || Spacewatch ||  || align=right | 2.3 km || 
|-id=259 bgcolor=#E9E9E9
| 615259 ||  || — || October 5, 2002 || Apache Point || SDSS Collaboration ||  || align=right | 1.0 km || 
|-id=260 bgcolor=#fefefe
| 615260 ||  || — || August 20, 2009 || Kitt Peak || Spacewatch ||  || align=right data-sort-value="0.57" | 570 m || 
|-id=261 bgcolor=#fefefe
| 615261 ||  || — || November 15, 2006 || Catalina || CSS ||  || align=right data-sort-value="0.77" | 770 m || 
|-id=262 bgcolor=#d6d6d6
| 615262 ||  || — || March 3, 2005 || Catalina || CSS ||  || align=right | 3.8 km || 
|-id=263 bgcolor=#fefefe
| 615263 ||  || — || December 14, 2010 || Mount Lemmon || Mount Lemmon Survey ||  || align=right | 1.1 km || 
|-id=264 bgcolor=#d6d6d6
| 615264 ||  || — || October 22, 2008 || Kitt Peak || Spacewatch ||  || align=right | 3.7 km || 
|-id=265 bgcolor=#d6d6d6
| 615265 ||  || — || August 15, 2002 || Palomar || NEAT ||  || align=right | 2.5 km || 
|-id=266 bgcolor=#d6d6d6
| 615266 ||  || — || October 5, 2013 || Mount Lemmon || Mount Lemmon Survey ||  || align=right | 2.8 km || 
|-id=267 bgcolor=#fefefe
| 615267 ||  || — || March 29, 2004 || Socorro || LINEAR || H || align=right data-sort-value="0.77" | 770 m || 
|-id=268 bgcolor=#E9E9E9
| 615268 ||  || — || September 13, 2002 || Palomar || NEAT ||  || align=right data-sort-value="0.84" | 840 m || 
|-id=269 bgcolor=#d6d6d6
| 615269 ||  || — || August 10, 2007 || Kitt Peak || Spacewatch ||  || align=right | 3.2 km || 
|-id=270 bgcolor=#fefefe
| 615270 ||  || — || September 17, 2009 || Catalina || CSS ||  || align=right data-sort-value="0.56" | 560 m || 
|-id=271 bgcolor=#fefefe
| 615271 ||  || — || September 28, 2002 || Haleakala || AMOS ||  || align=right data-sort-value="0.67" | 670 m || 
|-id=272 bgcolor=#E9E9E9
| 615272 ||  || — || March 8, 2013 || Haleakala || Pan-STARRS ||  || align=right | 1.4 km || 
|-id=273 bgcolor=#fefefe
| 615273 ||  || — || September 26, 2002 || Palomar || NEAT ||  || align=right data-sort-value="0.67" | 670 m || 
|-id=274 bgcolor=#fefefe
| 615274 ||  || — || September 27, 2002 || Palomar || NEAT ||  || align=right data-sort-value="0.73" | 730 m || 
|-id=275 bgcolor=#d6d6d6
| 615275 ||  || — || September 27, 2002 || Palomar || NEAT ||  || align=right | 3.2 km || 
|-id=276 bgcolor=#E9E9E9
| 615276 ||  || — || September 17, 2002 || Haleakala || AMOS ||  || align=right | 1.9 km || 
|-id=277 bgcolor=#E9E9E9
| 615277 ||  || — || September 28, 2002 || Haleakala || AMOS ||  || align=right | 1.6 km || 
|-id=278 bgcolor=#E9E9E9
| 615278 ||  || — || September 28, 2002 || Palomar || NEAT ||  || align=right | 1.2 km || 
|-id=279 bgcolor=#E9E9E9
| 615279 ||  || — || September 27, 2002 || Palomar || NEAT ||  || align=right | 2.0 km || 
|-id=280 bgcolor=#E9E9E9
| 615280 ||  || — || April 9, 2005 || Mount Lemmon || Mount Lemmon Survey ||  || align=right | 1.2 km || 
|-id=281 bgcolor=#E9E9E9
| 615281 ||  || — || August 29, 2006 || Kitt Peak || Spacewatch ||  || align=right data-sort-value="0.87" | 870 m || 
|-id=282 bgcolor=#fefefe
| 615282 ||  || — || December 13, 2006 || Kitt Peak || Spacewatch ||  || align=right data-sort-value="0.60" | 600 m || 
|-id=283 bgcolor=#fefefe
| 615283 ||  || — || December 16, 2006 || Mount Lemmon || Mount Lemmon Survey ||  || align=right data-sort-value="0.49" | 490 m || 
|-id=284 bgcolor=#fefefe
| 615284 ||  || — || April 5, 2008 || Kitt Peak || Spacewatch ||  || align=right data-sort-value="0.60" | 600 m || 
|-id=285 bgcolor=#d6d6d6
| 615285 ||  || — || October 24, 2008 || Kitt Peak || Spacewatch ||  || align=right | 2.1 km || 
|-id=286 bgcolor=#fefefe
| 615286 ||  || — || November 22, 2006 || Mount Lemmon || Mount Lemmon Survey ||  || align=right data-sort-value="0.56" | 560 m || 
|-id=287 bgcolor=#fefefe
| 615287 ||  || — || August 19, 2009 || La Sagra || OAM Obs. ||  || align=right data-sort-value="0.77" | 770 m || 
|-id=288 bgcolor=#d6d6d6
| 615288 ||  || — || November 20, 2008 || Mount Lemmon || Mount Lemmon Survey ||  || align=right | 2.5 km || 
|-id=289 bgcolor=#FA8072
| 615289 ||  || — || October 1, 2002 || Anderson Mesa || LONEOS ||  || align=right data-sort-value="0.98" | 980 m || 
|-id=290 bgcolor=#E9E9E9
| 615290 ||  || — || October 1, 2002 || Haleakala || AMOS ||  || align=right | 1.9 km || 
|-id=291 bgcolor=#E9E9E9
| 615291 ||  || — || October 1, 2002 || Haleakala || AMOS ||  || align=right | 1.8 km || 
|-id=292 bgcolor=#E9E9E9
| 615292 ||  || — || October 4, 2002 || Socorro || LINEAR ||  || align=right | 1.5 km || 
|-id=293 bgcolor=#d6d6d6
| 615293 ||  || — || October 4, 2002 || Kitt Peak || Spacewatch ||  || align=right | 2.0 km || 
|-id=294 bgcolor=#fefefe
| 615294 ||  || — || October 3, 2002 || Palomar || NEAT ||  || align=right data-sort-value="0.77" | 770 m || 
|-id=295 bgcolor=#E9E9E9
| 615295 ||  || — || September 28, 2002 || Haleakala || AMOS || critical || align=right | 1.7 km || 
|-id=296 bgcolor=#d6d6d6
| 615296 ||  || — || October 5, 2002 || Palomar || NEAT ||  || align=right | 2.8 km || 
|-id=297 bgcolor=#E9E9E9
| 615297 ||  || — || October 4, 2002 || Socorro || LINEAR ||  || align=right | 1.7 km || 
|-id=298 bgcolor=#fefefe
| 615298 ||  || — || October 5, 2002 || Palomar || NEAT ||  || align=right data-sort-value="0.60" | 600 m || 
|-id=299 bgcolor=#E9E9E9
| 615299 ||  || — || October 5, 2002 || Palomar || NEAT ||  || align=right | 1.2 km || 
|-id=300 bgcolor=#d6d6d6
| 615300 ||  || — || August 16, 2002 || Socorro || LINEAR ||  || align=right | 2.7 km || 
|}

615301–615400 

|-bgcolor=#fefefe
| 615301 ||  || — || September 28, 2002 || Haleakala || AMOS ||  || align=right data-sort-value="0.73" | 730 m || 
|-id=302 bgcolor=#fefefe
| 615302 ||  || — || October 7, 2002 || Palomar || NEAT ||  || align=right data-sort-value="0.67" | 670 m || 
|-id=303 bgcolor=#E9E9E9
| 615303 ||  || — || October 4, 2002 || Socorro || LINEAR ||  || align=right | 1.4 km || 
|-id=304 bgcolor=#fefefe
| 615304 ||  || — || July 22, 1995 || Kitt Peak || Spacewatch ||  || align=right data-sort-value="0.54" | 540 m || 
|-id=305 bgcolor=#fefefe
| 615305 ||  || — || October 3, 2002 || Socorro || LINEAR ||  || align=right data-sort-value="0.82" | 820 m || 
|-id=306 bgcolor=#E9E9E9
| 615306 ||  || — || October 4, 2002 || Palomar || NEAT ||  || align=right | 1.5 km || 
|-id=307 bgcolor=#E9E9E9
| 615307 ||  || — || September 7, 2002 || Socorro || LINEAR ||  || align=right | 1.7 km || 
|-id=308 bgcolor=#d6d6d6
| 615308 ||  || — || October 9, 2002 || Socorro || LINEAR ||  || align=right | 3.4 km || 
|-id=309 bgcolor=#fefefe
| 615309 ||  || — || October 11, 2002 || Palomar || NEAT ||  || align=right data-sort-value="0.48" | 480 m || 
|-id=310 bgcolor=#E9E9E9
| 615310 ||  || — || October 26, 2002 || Haleakala || AMOS ||  || align=right | 1.3 km || 
|-id=311 bgcolor=#d6d6d6
| 615311 ||  || — || December 21, 2008 || Kitt Peak || Spacewatch ||  || align=right | 2.4 km || 
|-id=312 bgcolor=#fefefe
| 615312 ||  || — || October 15, 2009 || Mount Lemmon || Mount Lemmon Survey ||  || align=right data-sort-value="0.85" | 850 m || 
|-id=313 bgcolor=#fefefe
| 615313 ||  || — || July 18, 2012 || Catalina || CSS ||  || align=right data-sort-value="0.88" | 880 m || 
|-id=314 bgcolor=#d6d6d6
| 615314 ||  || — || October 13, 2013 || Kitt Peak || Spacewatch ||  || align=right | 2.2 km || 
|-id=315 bgcolor=#E9E9E9
| 615315 ||  || — || November 7, 2007 || Kitt Peak || Spacewatch ||  || align=right | 1.6 km || 
|-id=316 bgcolor=#d6d6d6
| 615316 ||  || — || October 10, 2002 || Palomar || NEAT ||  || align=right | 2.6 km || 
|-id=317 bgcolor=#E9E9E9
| 615317 ||  || — || August 15, 2006 || Siding Spring || SSS ||  || align=right | 1.1 km || 
|-id=318 bgcolor=#E9E9E9
| 615318 ||  || — || October 15, 2002 || Palomar || NEAT ||  || align=right data-sort-value="0.72" | 720 m || 
|-id=319 bgcolor=#d6d6d6
| 615319 ||  || — || October 5, 2002 || Palomar || NEAT ||  || align=right | 3.2 km || 
|-id=320 bgcolor=#E9E9E9
| 615320 ||  || — || October 28, 2002 || Nogales || P. R. Holvorcem, M. Schwartz ||  || align=right | 1.3 km || 
|-id=321 bgcolor=#d6d6d6
| 615321 ||  || — || October 28, 2002 || Palomar || NEAT ||  || align=right | 2.6 km || 
|-id=322 bgcolor=#E9E9E9
| 615322 ||  || — || October 30, 2002 || Haleakala || AMOS || Tj (2.68) || align=right | 3.0 km || 
|-id=323 bgcolor=#d6d6d6
| 615323 ||  || — || October 30, 2002 || Palomar || NEAT ||  || align=right | 3.3 km || 
|-id=324 bgcolor=#d6d6d6
| 615324 ||  || — || October 15, 2002 || Palomar || NEAT ||  || align=right | 4.4 km || 
|-id=325 bgcolor=#E9E9E9
| 615325 ||  || — || July 21, 2006 || Catalina || CSS ||  || align=right | 1.2 km || 
|-id=326 bgcolor=#d6d6d6
| 615326 ||  || — || September 29, 2002 || Haleakala || AMOS ||  || align=right | 3.3 km || 
|-id=327 bgcolor=#d6d6d6
| 615327 ||  || — || November 21, 2014 || Haleakala || Pan-STARRS ||  || align=right | 3.3 km || 
|-id=328 bgcolor=#d6d6d6
| 615328 ||  || — || April 6, 2011 || Mount Lemmon || Mount Lemmon Survey ||  || align=right | 2.3 km || 
|-id=329 bgcolor=#fefefe
| 615329 ||  || — || April 22, 2009 || Mount Lemmon || Mount Lemmon Survey || H || align=right data-sort-value="0.53" | 530 m || 
|-id=330 bgcolor=#E9E9E9
| 615330 ||  || — || August 28, 2006 || Catalina || CSS ||  || align=right data-sort-value="0.89" | 890 m || 
|-id=331 bgcolor=#d6d6d6
| 615331 ||  || — || November 4, 2002 || Palomar || NEAT ||  || align=right | 2.9 km || 
|-id=332 bgcolor=#fefefe
| 615332 ||  || — || October 16, 2002 || Palomar || NEAT ||  || align=right data-sort-value="0.69" | 690 m || 
|-id=333 bgcolor=#fefefe
| 615333 ||  || — || November 7, 2002 || Socorro || LINEAR ||  || align=right data-sort-value="0.74" | 740 m || 
|-id=334 bgcolor=#d6d6d6
| 615334 ||  || — || October 30, 2002 || Palomar || NEAT ||  || align=right | 3.3 km || 
|-id=335 bgcolor=#d6d6d6
| 615335 ||  || — || October 30, 2002 || Palomar || NEAT ||  || align=right | 4.1 km || 
|-id=336 bgcolor=#d6d6d6
| 615336 ||  || — || November 13, 2002 || Kitt Peak || Spacewatch ||  || align=right | 3.8 km || 
|-id=337 bgcolor=#fefefe
| 615337 ||  || — || November 13, 2002 || Kitt Peak || Spacewatch ||  || align=right data-sort-value="0.61" | 610 m || 
|-id=338 bgcolor=#E9E9E9
| 615338 ||  || — || October 15, 2002 || Palomar || NEAT ||  || align=right | 1.9 km || 
|-id=339 bgcolor=#E9E9E9
| 615339 ||  || — || November 13, 2002 || Palomar || NEAT ||  || align=right | 1.6 km || 
|-id=340 bgcolor=#E9E9E9
| 615340 ||  || — || November 6, 2002 || Socorro || LINEAR ||  || align=right | 1.5 km || 
|-id=341 bgcolor=#d6d6d6
| 615341 ||  || — || November 4, 2002 || Kitt Peak || Spacewatch ||  || align=right | 2.6 km || 
|-id=342 bgcolor=#fefefe
| 615342 ||  || — || November 13, 2002 || Palomar || NEAT ||  || align=right data-sort-value="0.71" | 710 m || 
|-id=343 bgcolor=#fefefe
| 615343 ||  || — || February 23, 2007 || Catalina || CSS ||  || align=right data-sort-value="0.75" | 750 m || 
|-id=344 bgcolor=#fefefe
| 615344 ||  || — || February 16, 2007 || Catalina || CSS ||  || align=right data-sort-value="0.78" | 780 m || 
|-id=345 bgcolor=#d6d6d6
| 615345 ||  || — || November 20, 2008 || Kitt Peak || Spacewatch ||  || align=right | 2.0 km || 
|-id=346 bgcolor=#fefefe
| 615346 ||  || — || September 20, 2009 || Mount Lemmon || Mount Lemmon Survey ||  || align=right data-sort-value="0.68" | 680 m || 
|-id=347 bgcolor=#d6d6d6
| 615347 ||  || — || November 27, 2013 || Haleakala || Pan-STARRS ||  || align=right | 2.4 km || 
|-id=348 bgcolor=#E9E9E9
| 615348 ||  || — || September 26, 2006 || Catalina || CSS ||  || align=right | 1.5 km || 
|-id=349 bgcolor=#fefefe
| 615349 ||  || — || November 13, 2002 || Palomar || NEAT ||  || align=right data-sort-value="0.71" | 710 m || 
|-id=350 bgcolor=#d6d6d6
| 615350 ||  || — || April 13, 2011 || Kitt Peak || Spacewatch ||  || align=right | 2.9 km || 
|-id=351 bgcolor=#d6d6d6
| 615351 ||  || — || November 15, 2002 || Palomar || NEAT ||  || align=right | 2.5 km || 
|-id=352 bgcolor=#E9E9E9
| 615352 ||  || — || November 9, 2002 || Kitt Peak || Kitt Peak Obs. ||  || align=right data-sort-value="0.87" | 870 m || 
|-id=353 bgcolor=#fefefe
| 615353 ||  || — || November 24, 2002 || Palomar || NEAT ||  || align=right data-sort-value="0.45" | 450 m || 
|-id=354 bgcolor=#fefefe
| 615354 ||  || — || November 23, 2002 || Palomar || NEAT ||  || align=right data-sort-value="0.74" | 740 m || 
|-id=355 bgcolor=#E9E9E9
| 615355 ||  || — || November 4, 2002 || Palomar || NEAT ||  || align=right | 1.4 km || 
|-id=356 bgcolor=#E9E9E9
| 615356 ||  || — || July 29, 2005 || Siding Spring || SSS ||  || align=right | 2.4 km || 
|-id=357 bgcolor=#fefefe
| 615357 ||  || — || November 27, 2002 || Haleakala || AMOS ||  || align=right data-sort-value="0.66" | 660 m || 
|-id=358 bgcolor=#fefefe
| 615358 ||  || — || December 28, 2013 || Kitt Peak || Spacewatch ||  || align=right data-sort-value="0.65" | 650 m || 
|-id=359 bgcolor=#E9E9E9
| 615359 ||  || — || May 27, 2014 || Mount Lemmon || Mount Lemmon Survey ||  || align=right | 1.0 km || 
|-id=360 bgcolor=#d6d6d6
| 615360 ||  || — || August 27, 2013 || Haleakala || Pan-STARRS ||  || align=right | 3.1 km || 
|-id=361 bgcolor=#fefefe
| 615361 ||  || — || December 1, 2002 || Haleakala || AMOS ||  || align=right data-sort-value="0.72" | 720 m || 
|-id=362 bgcolor=#fefefe
| 615362 ||  || — || December 2, 2002 || Socorro || LINEAR ||  || align=right data-sort-value="0.93" | 930 m || 
|-id=363 bgcolor=#fefefe
| 615363 ||  || — || December 2, 2002 || Socorro || LINEAR ||  || align=right data-sort-value="0.60" | 600 m || 
|-id=364 bgcolor=#E9E9E9
| 615364 ||  || — || December 5, 2002 || Socorro || LINEAR ||  || align=right | 2.3 km || 
|-id=365 bgcolor=#fefefe
| 615365 ||  || — || November 24, 2002 || Palomar || NEAT ||  || align=right data-sort-value="0.74" | 740 m || 
|-id=366 bgcolor=#FA8072
| 615366 ||  || — || December 12, 2002 || Socorro || LINEAR || H || align=right data-sort-value="0.76" | 760 m || 
|-id=367 bgcolor=#fefefe
| 615367 ||  || — || December 11, 2002 || Palomar || NEAT ||  || align=right data-sort-value="0.75" | 750 m || 
|-id=368 bgcolor=#FA8072
| 615368 ||  || — || December 12, 2002 || Socorro || LINEAR ||  || align=right data-sort-value="0.79" | 790 m || 
|-id=369 bgcolor=#fefefe
| 615369 ||  || — || July 30, 2005 || Campo Imperatore || A. Boattini ||  || align=right data-sort-value="0.92" | 920 m || 
|-id=370 bgcolor=#d6d6d6
| 615370 ||  || — || December 3, 2008 || Kitt Peak || Spacewatch ||  || align=right | 3.8 km || 
|-id=371 bgcolor=#fefefe
| 615371 ||  || — || January 7, 2014 || Mount Lemmon || Mount Lemmon Survey ||  || align=right data-sort-value="0.67" | 670 m || 
|-id=372 bgcolor=#fefefe
| 615372 ||  || — || July 12, 2005 || Mount Lemmon || Mount Lemmon Survey ||  || align=right data-sort-value="0.72" | 720 m || 
|-id=373 bgcolor=#d6d6d6
| 615373 ||  || — || April 3, 2016 || Haleakala || Pan-STARRS ||  || align=right | 2.5 km || 
|-id=374 bgcolor=#fefefe
| 615374 ||  || — || December 28, 2002 || Kitt Peak || Spacewatch ||  || align=right data-sort-value="0.89" | 890 m || 
|-id=375 bgcolor=#fefefe
| 615375 ||  || — || December 26, 2009 || Kitt Peak || Spacewatch ||  || align=right data-sort-value="0.72" | 720 m || 
|-id=376 bgcolor=#fefefe
| 615376 ||  || — || December 31, 2002 || Socorro || LINEAR ||  || align=right data-sort-value="0.86" | 860 m || 
|-id=377 bgcolor=#E9E9E9
| 615377 ||  || — || January 10, 2003 || Kitt Peak || Spacewatch ||  || align=right | 1.2 km || 
|-id=378 bgcolor=#E9E9E9
| 615378 ||  || — || February 11, 2008 || Mount Lemmon || Mount Lemmon Survey ||  || align=right | 1.7 km || 
|-id=379 bgcolor=#fefefe
| 615379 ||  || — || October 26, 2009 || Kitt Peak || Spacewatch ||  || align=right data-sort-value="0.68" | 680 m || 
|-id=380 bgcolor=#E9E9E9
| 615380 ||  || — || January 24, 2003 || La Silla || A. Boattini, O. R. Hainaut ||  || align=right | 1.6 km || 
|-id=381 bgcolor=#E9E9E9
| 615381 ||  || — || January 24, 2003 || La Silla || A. Boattini, O. R. Hainaut ||  || align=right | 1.8 km || 
|-id=382 bgcolor=#d6d6d6
| 615382 ||  || — || January 26, 2003 || Palomar || NEAT ||  || align=right | 2.0 km || 
|-id=383 bgcolor=#d6d6d6
| 615383 ||  || — || January 27, 2003 || Socorro || LINEAR ||  || align=right | 3.3 km || 
|-id=384 bgcolor=#E9E9E9
| 615384 ||  || — || January 29, 2003 || Kitt Peak || Spacewatch ||  || align=right | 1.8 km || 
|-id=385 bgcolor=#fefefe
| 615385 ||  || — || January 28, 2003 || Socorro || LINEAR ||  || align=right data-sort-value="0.78" | 780 m || 
|-id=386 bgcolor=#fefefe
| 615386 ||  || — || August 23, 2004 || Siding Spring || SSS || H || align=right data-sort-value="0.73" | 730 m || 
|-id=387 bgcolor=#fefefe
| 615387 ||  || — || September 23, 2005 || Kitt Peak || Spacewatch ||  || align=right data-sort-value="0.83" | 830 m || 
|-id=388 bgcolor=#d6d6d6
| 615388 ||  || — || January 28, 2003 || Apache Point || SDSS Collaboration ||  || align=right | 3.0 km || 
|-id=389 bgcolor=#fefefe
| 615389 ||  || — || February 18, 2014 || Mount Lemmon || Mount Lemmon Survey ||  || align=right data-sort-value="0.83" | 830 m || 
|-id=390 bgcolor=#E9E9E9
| 615390 ||  || — || January 13, 2003 || Kitt Peak || Spacewatch ||  || align=right | 1.7 km || 
|-id=391 bgcolor=#E9E9E9
| 615391 ||  || — || March 5, 2008 || Mount Lemmon || Mount Lemmon Survey ||  || align=right | 1.7 km || 
|-id=392 bgcolor=#fefefe
| 615392 ||  || — || March 26, 2007 || Mount Lemmon || Mount Lemmon Survey ||  || align=right data-sort-value="0.70" | 700 m || 
|-id=393 bgcolor=#E9E9E9
| 615393 ||  || — || February 3, 2003 || Socorro || LINEAR ||  || align=right | 2.0 km || 
|-id=394 bgcolor=#fefefe
| 615394 ||  || — || February 9, 2003 || Haleakala || AMOS ||  || align=right data-sort-value="0.77" | 770 m || 
|-id=395 bgcolor=#E9E9E9
| 615395 ||  || — || November 2, 2010 || Mount Lemmon || Mount Lemmon Survey ||  || align=right | 1.0 km || 
|-id=396 bgcolor=#FA8072
| 615396 ||  || — || March 10, 2003 || Anderson Mesa || LONEOS ||  || align=right data-sort-value="0.64" | 640 m || 
|-id=397 bgcolor=#fefefe
| 615397 ||  || — || March 26, 2003 || Palomar || NEAT ||  || align=right data-sort-value="0.81" | 810 m || 
|-id=398 bgcolor=#fefefe
| 615398 ||  || — || May 24, 2011 || Haleakala || Pan-STARRS ||  || align=right data-sort-value="0.49" | 490 m || 
|-id=399 bgcolor=#E9E9E9
| 615399 ||  || — || February 13, 2011 || Mount Lemmon || Mount Lemmon Survey ||  || align=right data-sort-value="0.64" | 640 m || 
|-id=400 bgcolor=#fefefe
| 615400 ||  || — || March 24, 2003 || Kitt Peak || Spacewatch ||  || align=right data-sort-value="0.93" | 930 m || 
|}

615401–615500 

|-bgcolor=#E9E9E9
| 615401 ||  || — || April 6, 2008 || Mount Lemmon || Mount Lemmon Survey ||  || align=right | 1.8 km || 
|-id=402 bgcolor=#fefefe
| 615402 ||  || — || October 6, 2004 || Kitt Peak || Spacewatch ||  || align=right data-sort-value="0.56" | 560 m || 
|-id=403 bgcolor=#fefefe
| 615403 ||  || — || October 11, 2012 || Haleakala || Pan-STARRS ||  || align=right data-sort-value="0.58" | 580 m || 
|-id=404 bgcolor=#fefefe
| 615404 ||  || — || May 24, 2011 || Nogales || M. Schwartz, P. R. Holvorcem ||  || align=right data-sort-value="0.79" | 790 m || 
|-id=405 bgcolor=#fefefe
| 615405 ||  || — || January 3, 2014 || Kitt Peak || Spacewatch ||  || align=right data-sort-value="0.62" | 620 m || 
|-id=406 bgcolor=#fefefe
| 615406 ||  || — || May 16, 2013 || Mount Lemmon || Mount Lemmon Survey ||  || align=right data-sort-value="0.54" | 540 m || 
|-id=407 bgcolor=#fefefe
| 615407 ||  || — || March 23, 2003 || Apache Point || SDSS Collaboration ||  || align=right data-sort-value="0.62" | 620 m || 
|-id=408 bgcolor=#fefefe
| 615408 ||  || — || April 1, 2003 || Socorro || LINEAR ||  || align=right data-sort-value="0.71" | 710 m || 
|-id=409 bgcolor=#fefefe
| 615409 ||  || — || April 4, 2003 || Kitt Peak || Spacewatch ||  || align=right data-sort-value="0.78" | 780 m || 
|-id=410 bgcolor=#E9E9E9
| 615410 ||  || — || March 29, 2008 || Kitt Peak || Spacewatch ||  || align=right | 2.0 km || 
|-id=411 bgcolor=#fefefe
| 615411 ||  || — || July 14, 2015 || Haleakala || Pan-STARRS ||  || align=right data-sort-value="0.63" | 630 m || 
|-id=412 bgcolor=#fefefe
| 615412 ||  || — || August 14, 2012 || Haleakala || Pan-STARRS ||  || align=right data-sort-value="0.68" | 680 m || 
|-id=413 bgcolor=#fefefe
| 615413 ||  || — || May 25, 2007 || Mount Lemmon || Mount Lemmon Survey ||  || align=right data-sort-value="0.87" | 870 m || 
|-id=414 bgcolor=#E9E9E9
| 615414 ||  || — || November 27, 2010 || Mount Lemmon || Mount Lemmon Survey ||  || align=right | 1.9 km || 
|-id=415 bgcolor=#fefefe
| 615415 ||  || — || January 29, 2017 || Haleakala || Pan-STARRS ||  || align=right data-sort-value="0.65" | 650 m || 
|-id=416 bgcolor=#E9E9E9
| 615416 ||  || — || April 24, 2008 || Kitt Peak || Spacewatch ||  || align=right | 2.2 km || 
|-id=417 bgcolor=#fefefe
| 615417 ||  || — || April 8, 2003 || Kitt Peak || Spacewatch ||  || align=right data-sort-value="0.66" | 660 m || 
|-id=418 bgcolor=#fefefe
| 615418 ||  || — || October 3, 2013 || Haleakala || Pan-STARRS ||  || align=right data-sort-value="0.57" | 570 m || 
|-id=419 bgcolor=#fefefe
| 615419 ||  || — || March 27, 2011 || Mount Lemmon || Mount Lemmon Survey || H || align=right data-sort-value="0.50" | 500 m || 
|-id=420 bgcolor=#E9E9E9
| 615420 ||  || — || August 25, 2014 || Haleakala || Pan-STARRS ||  || align=right | 1.7 km || 
|-id=421 bgcolor=#E9E9E9
| 615421 ||  || — || January 10, 2006 || Mount Lemmon || Mount Lemmon Survey ||  || align=right | 1.0 km || 
|-id=422 bgcolor=#fefefe
| 615422 ||  || — || June 8, 2011 || Mount Lemmon || Mount Lemmon Survey ||  || align=right data-sort-value="0.57" | 570 m || 
|-id=423 bgcolor=#E9E9E9
| 615423 ||  || — || February 25, 2007 || Kitt Peak || Spacewatch ||  || align=right | 2.0 km || 
|-id=424 bgcolor=#fefefe
| 615424 ||  || — || April 25, 2003 || Kitt Peak || Spacewatch ||  || align=right data-sort-value="0.63" | 630 m || 
|-id=425 bgcolor=#fefefe
| 615425 ||  || — || December 25, 2009 || Kitt Peak || Spacewatch ||  || align=right data-sort-value="0.60" | 600 m || 
|-id=426 bgcolor=#fefefe
| 615426 ||  || — || April 26, 2003 || Kitt Peak || Spacewatch ||  || align=right data-sort-value="0.46" | 460 m || 
|-id=427 bgcolor=#fefefe
| 615427 ||  || — || January 24, 2006 || Mount Lemmon || Mount Lemmon Survey ||  || align=right data-sort-value="0.79" | 790 m || 
|-id=428 bgcolor=#fefefe
| 615428 ||  || — || May 1, 2003 || Kitt Peak || Spacewatch ||  || align=right data-sort-value="0.68" | 680 m || 
|-id=429 bgcolor=#fefefe
| 615429 ||  || — || May 26, 2003 || Kitt Peak || Spacewatch || H || align=right data-sort-value="0.43" | 430 m || 
|-id=430 bgcolor=#fefefe
| 615430 ||  || — || June 2, 2003 || Kitt Peak || Spacewatch ||  || align=right data-sort-value="0.70" | 700 m || 
|-id=431 bgcolor=#fefefe
| 615431 ||  || — || August 31, 2011 || Siding Spring || SSS ||  || align=right data-sort-value="0.64" | 640 m || 
|-id=432 bgcolor=#d6d6d6
| 615432 ||  || — || March 23, 2012 || Mount Lemmon || Mount Lemmon Survey ||  || align=right | 1.7 km || 
|-id=433 bgcolor=#d6d6d6
| 615433 ||  || — || September 30, 2005 || Mount Lemmon || Mount Lemmon Survey ||  || align=right | 1.9 km || 
|-id=434 bgcolor=#d6d6d6
| 615434 ||  || — || April 27, 2012 || Haleakala || Pan-STARRS ||  || align=right | 2.0 km || 
|-id=435 bgcolor=#d6d6d6
| 615435 ||  || — || January 1, 2008 || Kitt Peak || Spacewatch || 3:2 || align=right | 4.6 km || 
|-id=436 bgcolor=#d6d6d6
| 615436 ||  || — || June 20, 2013 || Haleakala || Pan-STARRS ||  || align=right | 2.6 km || 
|-id=437 bgcolor=#fefefe
| 615437 ||  || — || October 24, 2013 || Kitt Peak || Spacewatch ||  || align=right data-sort-value="0.56" | 560 m || 
|-id=438 bgcolor=#E9E9E9
| 615438 ||  || — || August 18, 2003 || Campo Imperatore || CINEOS ||  || align=right | 1.3 km || 
|-id=439 bgcolor=#E9E9E9
| 615439 ||  || — || August 22, 2003 || Haleakala || AMOS ||  || align=right data-sort-value="0.91" | 910 m || 
|-id=440 bgcolor=#d6d6d6
| 615440 ||  || — || August 23, 2003 || Palomar || NEAT ||  || align=right | 1.9 km || 
|-id=441 bgcolor=#E9E9E9
| 615441 ||  || — || August 25, 2003 || Palomar || NEAT ||  || align=right | 1.4 km || 
|-id=442 bgcolor=#fefefe
| 615442 ||  || — || August 31, 2003 || Kitt Peak || Spacewatch ||  || align=right data-sort-value="0.52" | 520 m || 
|-id=443 bgcolor=#FA8072
| 615443 ||  || — || August 29, 2003 || Haleakala || AMOS ||  || align=right | 1.3 km || 
|-id=444 bgcolor=#fefefe
| 615444 ||  || — || August 23, 2003 || Palomar || NEAT ||  || align=right data-sort-value="0.75" | 750 m || 
|-id=445 bgcolor=#E9E9E9
| 615445 ||  || — || August 27, 2003 || Palomar || NEAT ||  || align=right | 1.2 km || 
|-id=446 bgcolor=#fefefe
| 615446 ||  || — || November 3, 2010 || Kitt Peak || Spacewatch ||  || align=right data-sort-value="0.61" | 610 m || 
|-id=447 bgcolor=#fefefe
| 615447 ||  || — || September 12, 2007 || Mount Lemmon || Mount Lemmon Survey ||  || align=right data-sort-value="0.62" | 620 m || 
|-id=448 bgcolor=#fefefe
| 615448 ||  || — || October 13, 2010 || Mount Lemmon || Mount Lemmon Survey ||  || align=right data-sort-value="0.61" | 610 m || 
|-id=449 bgcolor=#E9E9E9
| 615449 ||  || — || September 15, 2003 || Haleakala || AMOS ||  || align=right | 1.4 km || 
|-id=450 bgcolor=#fefefe
| 615450 ||  || — || September 17, 2003 || Palomar || NEAT ||  || align=right data-sort-value="0.68" | 680 m || 
|-id=451 bgcolor=#FA8072
| 615451 ||  || — || August 25, 2003 || Cerro Tololo || Cerro Tololo Obs. ||  || align=right data-sort-value="0.54" | 540 m || 
|-id=452 bgcolor=#FA8072
| 615452 ||  || — || September 17, 2003 || Kitt Peak || Spacewatch ||  || align=right data-sort-value="0.87" | 870 m || 
|-id=453 bgcolor=#E9E9E9
| 615453 ||  || — || September 16, 2003 || Kitt Peak || Spacewatch ||  || align=right data-sort-value="0.79" | 790 m || 
|-id=454 bgcolor=#FA8072
| 615454 ||  || — || September 16, 2003 || Palomar || NEAT ||  || align=right | 1.5 km || 
|-id=455 bgcolor=#E9E9E9
| 615455 ||  || — || August 25, 2003 || Palomar || NEAT ||  || align=right | 1.3 km || 
|-id=456 bgcolor=#fefefe
| 615456 ||  || — || August 31, 2003 || Haleakala || AMOS ||  || align=right data-sort-value="0.60" | 600 m || 
|-id=457 bgcolor=#E9E9E9
| 615457 ||  || — || September 18, 2003 || Palomar || NEAT ||  || align=right | 1.1 km || 
|-id=458 bgcolor=#E9E9E9
| 615458 ||  || — || September 19, 2003 || Palomar || NEAT ||  || align=right | 1.3 km || 
|-id=459 bgcolor=#fefefe
| 615459 ||  || — || September 17, 2003 || Kitt Peak || Spacewatch ||  || align=right data-sort-value="0.60" | 600 m || 
|-id=460 bgcolor=#d6d6d6
| 615460 ||  || — || September 19, 2003 || Piszkesteto || K. Sárneczky, B. Sipőcz ||  || align=right | 3.0 km || 
|-id=461 bgcolor=#E9E9E9
| 615461 ||  || — || September 20, 2003 || Mount Graham || W. H. Ryan ||  || align=right | 1.1 km || 
|-id=462 bgcolor=#E9E9E9
| 615462 ||  || — || September 18, 2003 || Kitt Peak || Spacewatch ||  || align=right data-sort-value="0.96" | 960 m || 
|-id=463 bgcolor=#E9E9E9
| 615463 ||  || — || September 19, 2003 || Palomar || NEAT || critical || align=right | 1.3 km || 
|-id=464 bgcolor=#E9E9E9
| 615464 ||  || — || September 17, 2003 || Socorro || LINEAR ||  || align=right | 1.2 km || 
|-id=465 bgcolor=#E9E9E9
| 615465 ||  || — || August 31, 2003 || Haleakala || AMOS ||  || align=right | 1.6 km || 
|-id=466 bgcolor=#E9E9E9
| 615466 ||  || — || August 29, 2003 || Haleakala || AMOS ||  || align=right | 1.7 km || 
|-id=467 bgcolor=#E9E9E9
| 615467 ||  || — || September 20, 2003 || Anderson Mesa || LONEOS ||  || align=right | 1.4 km || 
|-id=468 bgcolor=#d6d6d6
| 615468 ||  || — || September 20, 2003 || Palomar || NEAT ||  || align=right | 3.0 km || 
|-id=469 bgcolor=#d6d6d6
| 615469 ||  || — || September 22, 2003 || Kitt Peak || Spacewatch ||  || align=right | 2.8 km || 
|-id=470 bgcolor=#E9E9E9
| 615470 ||  || — || September 18, 2003 || Kitt Peak || Spacewatch ||  || align=right | 1.2 km || 
|-id=471 bgcolor=#E9E9E9
| 615471 ||  || — || August 22, 2003 || Palomar || NEAT ||  || align=right data-sort-value="0.89" | 890 m || 
|-id=472 bgcolor=#d6d6d6
| 615472 ||  || — || September 27, 2003 || Kitt Peak || Spacewatch ||  || align=right | 2.1 km || 
|-id=473 bgcolor=#fefefe
| 615473 ||  || — || September 25, 2003 || Palomar || NEAT ||  || align=right data-sort-value="0.68" | 680 m || 
|-id=474 bgcolor=#d6d6d6
| 615474 ||  || — || September 17, 2003 || Kitt Peak || Spacewatch ||  || align=right | 2.8 km || 
|-id=475 bgcolor=#d6d6d6
| 615475 ||  || — || September 28, 2003 || Kitt Peak || Spacewatch ||  || align=right | 1.9 km || 
|-id=476 bgcolor=#d6d6d6
| 615476 ||  || — || September 28, 2003 || Kitt Peak || Spacewatch ||  || align=right | 2.5 km || 
|-id=477 bgcolor=#fefefe
| 615477 ||  || — || September 25, 2003 || Palomar || NEAT ||  || align=right data-sort-value="0.70" | 700 m || 
|-id=478 bgcolor=#fefefe
| 615478 ||  || — || September 30, 2003 || Junk Bond || D. Healy ||  || align=right data-sort-value="0.69" | 690 m || 
|-id=479 bgcolor=#fefefe
| 615479 ||  || — || September 17, 2003 || Socorro || LINEAR ||  || align=right data-sort-value="0.88" | 880 m || 
|-id=480 bgcolor=#fefefe
| 615480 ||  || — || September 17, 2003 || Kitt Peak || Spacewatch ||  || align=right data-sort-value="0.50" | 500 m || 
|-id=481 bgcolor=#fefefe
| 615481 ||  || — || September 18, 2003 || Kitt Peak || Spacewatch ||  || align=right data-sort-value="0.55" | 550 m || 
|-id=482 bgcolor=#d6d6d6
| 615482 ||  || — || October 16, 2003 || Palomar || NEAT ||  || align=right | 2.9 km || 
|-id=483 bgcolor=#E9E9E9
| 615483 ||  || — || October 17, 2003 || Kitt Peak || Spacewatch ||  || align=right data-sort-value="0.99" | 990 m || 
|-id=484 bgcolor=#E9E9E9
| 615484 ||  || — || September 22, 2003 || Palomar || NEAT ||  || align=right | 1.3 km || 
|-id=485 bgcolor=#d6d6d6
| 615485 ||  || — || September 20, 2003 || Kitt Peak || Spacewatch ||  || align=right | 2.1 km || 
|-id=486 bgcolor=#d6d6d6
| 615486 ||  || — || September 21, 2003 || Kitt Peak || Spacewatch ||  || align=right | 2.1 km || 
|-id=487 bgcolor=#E9E9E9
| 615487 ||  || — || September 21, 2003 || Kitt Peak || Spacewatch ||  || align=right | 1.1 km || 
|-id=488 bgcolor=#E9E9E9
| 615488 ||  || — || December 21, 2004 || Kitt Peak || Spacewatch ||  || align=right data-sort-value="0.89" | 890 m || 
|-id=489 bgcolor=#fefefe
| 615489 ||  || — || September 26, 2003 || Apache Point || SDSS Collaboration ||  || align=right data-sort-value="0.57" | 570 m || 
|-id=490 bgcolor=#d6d6d6
| 615490 ||  || — || September 26, 2003 || Apache Point || SDSS Collaboration ||  || align=right | 2.1 km || 
|-id=491 bgcolor=#d6d6d6
| 615491 ||  || — || October 22, 2003 || Kitt Peak || Kitt Peak Obs. ||  || align=right | 2.2 km || 
|-id=492 bgcolor=#E9E9E9
| 615492 ||  || — || September 26, 2003 || Apache Point || SDSS Collaboration ||  || align=right data-sort-value="0.78" | 780 m || 
|-id=493 bgcolor=#d6d6d6
| 615493 ||  || — || September 26, 2003 || Apache Point || SDSS Collaboration ||  || align=right | 2.2 km || 
|-id=494 bgcolor=#fefefe
| 615494 ||  || — || February 4, 2005 || Mount Lemmon || Mount Lemmon Survey ||  || align=right data-sort-value="0.63" | 630 m || 
|-id=495 bgcolor=#d6d6d6
| 615495 ||  || — || September 26, 2003 || Apache Point || SDSS Collaboration ||  || align=right | 3.1 km || 
|-id=496 bgcolor=#d6d6d6
| 615496 ||  || — || December 15, 2004 || Kitt Peak || Spacewatch ||  || align=right | 2.8 km || 
|-id=497 bgcolor=#E9E9E9
| 615497 ||  || — || September 26, 2003 || Apache Point || SDSS Collaboration ||  || align=right | 1.1 km || 
|-id=498 bgcolor=#d6d6d6
| 615498 ||  || — || September 27, 2003 || Apache Point || SDSS Collaboration ||  || align=right | 2.6 km || 
|-id=499 bgcolor=#E9E9E9
| 615499 ||  || — || September 27, 2003 || Apache Point || SDSS Collaboration ||  || align=right data-sort-value="0.85" | 850 m || 
|-id=500 bgcolor=#d6d6d6
| 615500 ||  || — || September 27, 2003 || Apache Point || SDSS Collaboration ||  || align=right | 2.6 km || 
|}

615501–615600 

|-bgcolor=#E9E9E9
| 615501 ||  || — || September 27, 2003 || Apache Point || SDSS Collaboration ||  || align=right | 1.4 km || 
|-id=502 bgcolor=#d6d6d6
| 615502 ||  || — || September 28, 2003 || Apache Point || SDSS Collaboration ||  || align=right | 1.9 km || 
|-id=503 bgcolor=#d6d6d6
| 615503 ||  || — || September 26, 2003 || Apache Point || SDSS Collaboration ||  || align=right | 2.2 km || 
|-id=504 bgcolor=#d6d6d6
| 615504 ||  || — || December 20, 2004 || Mount Lemmon || Mount Lemmon Survey ||  || align=right | 3.1 km || 
|-id=505 bgcolor=#E9E9E9
| 615505 ||  || — || September 28, 2003 || Apache Point || SDSS Collaboration ||  || align=right | 1.7 km || 
|-id=506 bgcolor=#fefefe
| 615506 ||  || — || September 26, 2003 || Apache Point || SDSS Collaboration ||  || align=right data-sort-value="0.54" | 540 m || 
|-id=507 bgcolor=#E9E9E9
| 615507 ||  || — || September 17, 2003 || Anderson Mesa || LONEOS ||  || align=right data-sort-value="0.86" | 860 m || 
|-id=508 bgcolor=#d6d6d6
| 615508 ||  || — || September 27, 2003 || Kitt Peak || Spacewatch ||  || align=right | 2.3 km || 
|-id=509 bgcolor=#d6d6d6
| 615509 ||  || — || September 30, 2003 || Kitt Peak || Spacewatch ||  || align=right | 2.6 km || 
|-id=510 bgcolor=#E9E9E9
| 615510 ||  || — || September 18, 2003 || Palomar || NEAT ||  || align=right | 2.2 km || 
|-id=511 bgcolor=#fefefe
| 615511 ||  || — || September 19, 2003 || Palomar || NEAT ||  || align=right data-sort-value="0.71" | 710 m || 
|-id=512 bgcolor=#d6d6d6
| 615512 ||  || — || September 21, 2003 || Palomar || NEAT ||  || align=right | 2.2 km || 
|-id=513 bgcolor=#fefefe
| 615513 ||  || — || September 22, 2003 || Anderson Mesa || LONEOS ||  || align=right data-sort-value="0.49" | 490 m || 
|-id=514 bgcolor=#FA8072
| 615514 ||  || — || September 28, 2003 || Anderson Mesa || LONEOS ||  || align=right data-sort-value="0.62" | 620 m || 
|-id=515 bgcolor=#d6d6d6
| 615515 ||  || — || September 21, 2003 || Palomar || NEAT ||  || align=right | 2.6 km || 
|-id=516 bgcolor=#d6d6d6
| 615516 ||  || — || September 21, 2009 || Kitt Peak || Spacewatch ||  || align=right | 2.5 km || 
|-id=517 bgcolor=#fefefe
| 615517 ||  || — || October 20, 2003 || Kitt Peak || Spacewatch ||  || align=right data-sort-value="0.71" | 710 m || 
|-id=518 bgcolor=#d6d6d6
| 615518 ||  || — || June 9, 2007 || Kitt Peak || Spacewatch ||  || align=right | 2.2 km || 
|-id=519 bgcolor=#fefefe
| 615519 ||  || — || March 9, 2005 || Mount Lemmon || Mount Lemmon Survey ||  || align=right data-sort-value="0.53" | 530 m || 
|-id=520 bgcolor=#fefefe
| 615520 ||  || — || November 11, 2013 || Kitt Peak || Spacewatch ||  || align=right data-sort-value="0.59" | 590 m || 
|-id=521 bgcolor=#fefefe
| 615521 ||  || — || October 7, 2013 || Kitt Peak || Spacewatch ||  || align=right data-sort-value="0.54" | 540 m || 
|-id=522 bgcolor=#fefefe
| 615522 ||  || — || May 4, 2009 || Mount Lemmon || Mount Lemmon Survey ||  || align=right data-sort-value="0.50" | 500 m || 
|-id=523 bgcolor=#E9E9E9
| 615523 ||  || — || February 9, 2005 || Kitt Peak || Spacewatch ||  || align=right data-sort-value="0.96" | 960 m || 
|-id=524 bgcolor=#E9E9E9
| 615524 ||  || — || September 19, 2003 || Kitt Peak || Spacewatch ||  || align=right | 2.2 km || 
|-id=525 bgcolor=#E9E9E9
| 615525 ||  || — || September 20, 2003 || Kitt Peak || Spacewatch ||  || align=right | 1.0 km || 
|-id=526 bgcolor=#fefefe
| 615526 ||  || — || November 3, 2016 || Haleakala || Pan-STARRS ||  || align=right data-sort-value="0.52" | 520 m || 
|-id=527 bgcolor=#fefefe
| 615527 ||  || — || February 24, 2015 || Haleakala || Pan-STARRS ||  || align=right data-sort-value="0.67" | 670 m || 
|-id=528 bgcolor=#d6d6d6
| 615528 ||  || — || July 13, 2013 || Mount Lemmon || Mount Lemmon Survey ||  || align=right | 2.0 km || 
|-id=529 bgcolor=#d6d6d6
| 615529 ||  || — || January 16, 2005 || Kitt Peak || Spacewatch ||  || align=right | 2.4 km || 
|-id=530 bgcolor=#d6d6d6
| 615530 ||  || — || August 9, 2013 || Kitt Peak || Spacewatch ||  || align=right | 1.9 km || 
|-id=531 bgcolor=#E9E9E9
| 615531 ||  || — || July 12, 2015 || Haleakala || Pan-STARRS ||  || align=right data-sort-value="0.91" | 910 m || 
|-id=532 bgcolor=#fefefe
| 615532 ||  || — || September 18, 2003 || Kitt Peak || Spacewatch ||  || align=right data-sort-value="0.52" | 520 m || 
|-id=533 bgcolor=#d6d6d6
| 615533 ||  || — || September 28, 2003 || Kitt Peak || Spacewatch ||  || align=right | 1.7 km || 
|-id=534 bgcolor=#E9E9E9
| 615534 ||  || — || April 30, 2014 || Haleakala || Pan-STARRS ||  || align=right data-sort-value="0.98" | 980 m || 
|-id=535 bgcolor=#d6d6d6
| 615535 ||  || — || March 20, 2007 || Catalina || CSS ||  || align=right | 3.0 km || 
|-id=536 bgcolor=#d6d6d6
| 615536 ||  || — || September 20, 1998 || Kitt Peak || Spacewatch ||  || align=right | 2.3 km || 
|-id=537 bgcolor=#d6d6d6
| 615537 ||  || — || April 27, 2012 || Haleakala || Pan-STARRS ||  || align=right | 2.0 km || 
|-id=538 bgcolor=#fefefe
| 615538 ||  || — || September 28, 2003 || Kitt Peak || Spacewatch ||  || align=right data-sort-value="0.37" | 370 m || 
|-id=539 bgcolor=#d6d6d6
| 615539 ||  || — || September 29, 2003 || Kitt Peak || Spacewatch ||  || align=right | 2.2 km || 
|-id=540 bgcolor=#fefefe
| 615540 ||  || — || September 30, 2003 || Kitt Peak || Spacewatch ||  || align=right data-sort-value="0.65" | 650 m || 
|-id=541 bgcolor=#d6d6d6
| 615541 ||  || — || September 27, 2003 || Kitt Peak || Spacewatch ||  || align=right | 1.9 km || 
|-id=542 bgcolor=#E9E9E9
| 615542 ||  || — || September 22, 2003 || Kitt Peak || Spacewatch ||  || align=right data-sort-value="0.79" | 790 m || 
|-id=543 bgcolor=#fefefe
| 615543 ||  || — || October 1, 2003 || Kitt Peak || Spacewatch ||  || align=right data-sort-value="0.63" | 630 m || 
|-id=544 bgcolor=#d6d6d6
| 615544 ||  || — || September 23, 2003 || Palomar || NEAT ||  || align=right | 2.6 km || 
|-id=545 bgcolor=#E9E9E9
| 615545 ||  || — || October 1, 2003 || Kitt Peak || Spacewatch ||  || align=right data-sort-value="0.93" | 930 m || 
|-id=546 bgcolor=#d6d6d6
| 615546 ||  || — || October 1, 2003 || Kitt Peak || Spacewatch ||  || align=right | 2.4 km || 
|-id=547 bgcolor=#d6d6d6
| 615547 ||  || — || October 1, 2003 || Kitt Peak || Spacewatch ||  || align=right | 2.5 km || 
|-id=548 bgcolor=#d6d6d6
| 615548 ||  || — || October 2, 2003 || Kitt Peak || Spacewatch ||  || align=right | 2.6 km || 
|-id=549 bgcolor=#E9E9E9
| 615549 ||  || — || October 3, 2003 || Kitt Peak || Spacewatch ||  || align=right | 2.0 km || 
|-id=550 bgcolor=#E9E9E9
| 615550 ||  || — || October 3, 2003 || Haleakala || AMOS ||  || align=right | 2.4 km || 
|-id=551 bgcolor=#E9E9E9
| 615551 ||  || — || October 5, 2003 || Kitt Peak || Spacewatch ||  || align=right data-sort-value="0.91" | 910 m || 
|-id=552 bgcolor=#d6d6d6
| 615552 ||  || — || October 5, 2003 || Kitt Peak || Spacewatch || 7:4 || align=right | 3.3 km || 
|-id=553 bgcolor=#E9E9E9
| 615553 ||  || — || October 5, 2003 || Kitt Peak || Spacewatch ||  || align=right data-sort-value="0.94" | 940 m || 
|-id=554 bgcolor=#E9E9E9
| 615554 ||  || — || October 2, 2003 || Kitt Peak || Spacewatch ||  || align=right | 2.3 km || 
|-id=555 bgcolor=#FA8072
| 615555 ||  || — || October 2, 2003 || Kitt Peak || Spacewatch ||  || align=right data-sort-value="0.93" | 930 m || 
|-id=556 bgcolor=#d6d6d6
| 615556 ||  || — || November 11, 2009 || Mount Lemmon || Mount Lemmon Survey ||  || align=right | 2.5 km || 
|-id=557 bgcolor=#d6d6d6
| 615557 ||  || — || October 2, 2003 || Kitt Peak || Spacewatch ||  || align=right | 2.1 km || 
|-id=558 bgcolor=#fefefe
| 615558 ||  || — || May 14, 2009 || Kitt Peak || Spacewatch ||  || align=right data-sort-value="0.54" | 540 m || 
|-id=559 bgcolor=#fefefe
| 615559 ||  || — || March 30, 2015 || Haleakala || Pan-STARRS ||  || align=right data-sort-value="0.62" | 620 m || 
|-id=560 bgcolor=#E9E9E9
| 615560 ||  || — || October 5, 2003 || Kitt Peak || Spacewatch ||  || align=right data-sort-value="0.84" | 840 m || 
|-id=561 bgcolor=#E9E9E9
| 615561 ||  || — || February 5, 2013 || Mount Lemmon || Mount Lemmon Survey ||  || align=right data-sort-value="0.76" | 760 m || 
|-id=562 bgcolor=#d6d6d6
| 615562 ||  || — || October 3, 2003 || Kitt Peak || Spacewatch ||  || align=right | 2.4 km || 
|-id=563 bgcolor=#E9E9E9
| 615563 ||  || — || July 28, 2003 || Palomar || NEAT ||  || align=right | 2.6 km || 
|-id=564 bgcolor=#fefefe
| 615564 ||  || — || October 16, 2003 || Kitt Peak || Spacewatch ||  || align=right data-sort-value="0.55" | 550 m || 
|-id=565 bgcolor=#d6d6d6
| 615565 ||  || — || September 19, 2003 || Kitt Peak || Spacewatch || 3:2 || align=right | 2.9 km || 
|-id=566 bgcolor=#E9E9E9
| 615566 ||  || — || October 17, 2003 || Kitt Peak || Spacewatch ||  || align=right data-sort-value="0.90" | 900 m || 
|-id=567 bgcolor=#E9E9E9
| 615567 ||  || — || October 1, 2003 || Kitt Peak || Spacewatch ||  || align=right | 1.4 km || 
|-id=568 bgcolor=#E9E9E9
| 615568 ||  || — || September 17, 2003 || Palomar || NEAT ||  || align=right | 1.5 km || 
|-id=569 bgcolor=#d6d6d6
| 615569 ||  || — || September 16, 2003 || Kitt Peak || Spacewatch ||  || align=right | 2.2 km || 
|-id=570 bgcolor=#E9E9E9
| 615570 ||  || — || October 19, 2003 || Kitt Peak || Spacewatch ||  || align=right data-sort-value="0.76" | 760 m || 
|-id=571 bgcolor=#E9E9E9
| 615571 ||  || — || October 19, 2003 || Anderson Mesa || LONEOS ||  || align=right | 3.7 km || 
|-id=572 bgcolor=#E9E9E9
| 615572 ||  || — || October 20, 2003 || Kitt Peak || Spacewatch ||  || align=right | 1.4 km || 
|-id=573 bgcolor=#E9E9E9
| 615573 ||  || — || October 18, 2003 || Kitt Peak || Spacewatch ||  || align=right data-sort-value="0.85" | 850 m || 
|-id=574 bgcolor=#fefefe
| 615574 ||  || — || October 18, 2003 || Palomar || NEAT ||  || align=right data-sort-value="0.64" | 640 m || 
|-id=575 bgcolor=#FA8072
| 615575 ||  || — || October 21, 2003 || Kitt Peak || Spacewatch ||  || align=right | 1.1 km || 
|-id=576 bgcolor=#fefefe
| 615576 ||  || — || September 18, 2003 || Kitt Peak || Spacewatch ||  || align=right data-sort-value="0.45" | 450 m || 
|-id=577 bgcolor=#E9E9E9
| 615577 ||  || — || September 19, 2003 || Palomar || NEAT ||  || align=right | 1.2 km || 
|-id=578 bgcolor=#d6d6d6
| 615578 ||  || — || October 16, 2003 || Palomar || NEAT ||  || align=right | 3.5 km || 
|-id=579 bgcolor=#d6d6d6
| 615579 ||  || — || October 19, 2003 || Kitt Peak || Spacewatch ||  || align=right | 2.6 km || 
|-id=580 bgcolor=#E9E9E9
| 615580 ||  || — || October 20, 2003 || Kitt Peak || Spacewatch ||  || align=right | 1.2 km || 
|-id=581 bgcolor=#fefefe
| 615581 ||  || — || October 21, 2003 || Kitt Peak || Spacewatch ||  || align=right data-sort-value="0.66" | 660 m || 
|-id=582 bgcolor=#E9E9E9
| 615582 ||  || — || October 21, 2003 || Kitt Peak || Spacewatch ||  || align=right | 1.4 km || 
|-id=583 bgcolor=#E9E9E9
| 615583 ||  || — || September 28, 2003 || Kitt Peak || Spacewatch ||  || align=right data-sort-value="0.61" | 610 m || 
|-id=584 bgcolor=#d6d6d6
| 615584 ||  || — || October 24, 2003 || Socorro || LINEAR ||  || align=right | 2.7 km || 
|-id=585 bgcolor=#d6d6d6
| 615585 ||  || — || October 21, 2003 || Palomar || NEAT ||  || align=right | 2.9 km || 
|-id=586 bgcolor=#E9E9E9
| 615586 ||  || — || September 28, 2003 || Kitt Peak || Spacewatch ||  || align=right | 1.2 km || 
|-id=587 bgcolor=#d6d6d6
| 615587 ||  || — || October 27, 2003 || Kitt Peak || Spacewatch ||  || align=right | 2.1 km || 
|-id=588 bgcolor=#E9E9E9
| 615588 ||  || — || October 16, 2003 || Kitt Peak || Spacewatch ||  || align=right data-sort-value="0.80" | 800 m || 
|-id=589 bgcolor=#d6d6d6
| 615589 ||  || — || September 20, 2003 || Palomar || NEAT ||  || align=right | 3.3 km || 
|-id=590 bgcolor=#E9E9E9
| 615590 ||  || — || September 18, 2003 || Kitt Peak || Spacewatch ||  || align=right data-sort-value="0.83" | 830 m || 
|-id=591 bgcolor=#d6d6d6
| 615591 ||  || — || October 16, 2003 || Kitt Peak || Spacewatch ||  || align=right | 2.2 km || 
|-id=592 bgcolor=#fefefe
| 615592 ||  || — || October 2, 2003 || Kitt Peak || Spacewatch ||  || align=right data-sort-value="0.51" | 510 m || 
|-id=593 bgcolor=#E9E9E9
| 615593 ||  || — || September 30, 2003 || Kitt Peak || Spacewatch ||  || align=right data-sort-value="0.85" | 850 m || 
|-id=594 bgcolor=#d6d6d6
| 615594 ||  || — || October 18, 2003 || Kitt Peak || Spacewatch ||  || align=right | 2.3 km || 
|-id=595 bgcolor=#d6d6d6
| 615595 ||  || — || October 18, 2003 || Kitt Peak || Spacewatch ||  || align=right | 1.7 km || 
|-id=596 bgcolor=#E9E9E9
| 615596 ||  || — || September 18, 2003 || Kitt Peak || Spacewatch ||  || align=right data-sort-value="0.83" | 830 m || 
|-id=597 bgcolor=#d6d6d6
| 615597 ||  || — || December 19, 2004 || Catalina || CSS ||  || align=right | 2.6 km || 
|-id=598 bgcolor=#fefefe
| 615598 ||  || — || September 29, 2003 || Kitt Peak || Spacewatch ||  || align=right data-sort-value="0.53" | 530 m || 
|-id=599 bgcolor=#d6d6d6
| 615599 ||  || — || October 19, 2003 || Apache Point || SDSS Collaboration ||  || align=right | 2.1 km || 
|-id=600 bgcolor=#E9E9E9
| 615600 ||  || — || October 19, 2003 || Kitt Peak || Spacewatch ||  || align=right data-sort-value="0.85" | 850 m || 
|}

615601–615700 

|-bgcolor=#fefefe
| 615601 ||  || — || October 21, 2003 || Kitt Peak || Spacewatch ||  || align=right data-sort-value="0.94" | 940 m || 
|-id=602 bgcolor=#fefefe
| 615602 ||  || — || October 21, 2003 || Kitt Peak || Spacewatch ||  || align=right data-sort-value="0.62" | 620 m || 
|-id=603 bgcolor=#E9E9E9
| 615603 ||  || — || October 3, 2003 || Kitt Peak || Spacewatch ||  || align=right | 1.5 km || 
|-id=604 bgcolor=#E9E9E9
| 615604 ||  || — || September 29, 2003 || Kitt Peak || Spacewatch ||  || align=right data-sort-value="0.96" | 960 m || 
|-id=605 bgcolor=#d6d6d6
| 615605 ||  || — || September 28, 2003 || Apache Point || SDSS Collaboration ||  || align=right | 1.9 km || 
|-id=606 bgcolor=#fefefe
| 615606 ||  || — || April 1, 2005 || Kitt Peak || Spacewatch || H || align=right data-sort-value="0.51" | 510 m || 
|-id=607 bgcolor=#d6d6d6
| 615607 ||  || — || October 22, 2003 || Apache Point || SDSS Collaboration ||  || align=right | 1.9 km || 
|-id=608 bgcolor=#d6d6d6
| 615608 ||  || — || October 22, 2003 || Apache Point || SDSS Collaboration ||  || align=right | 2.0 km || 
|-id=609 bgcolor=#d6d6d6
| 615609 ||  || — || October 22, 2003 || Apache Point || SDSS Collaboration ||  || align=right | 2.0 km || 
|-id=610 bgcolor=#d6d6d6
| 615610 ||  || — || October 22, 2003 || Apache Point || SDSS Collaboration ||  || align=right | 2.1 km || 
|-id=611 bgcolor=#E9E9E9
| 615611 ||  || — || October 22, 2003 || Apache Point || SDSS Collaboration ||  || align=right data-sort-value="0.81" | 810 m || 
|-id=612 bgcolor=#FA8072
| 615612 ||  || — || October 19, 2003 || Anderson Mesa || LONEOS ||  || align=right data-sort-value="0.68" | 680 m || 
|-id=613 bgcolor=#fefefe
| 615613 ||  || — || January 27, 2012 || Mount Lemmon || Mount Lemmon Survey ||  || align=right data-sort-value="0.69" | 690 m || 
|-id=614 bgcolor=#d6d6d6
| 615614 ||  || — || October 27, 2003 || Kitt Peak || Spacewatch ||  || align=right | 3.1 km || 
|-id=615 bgcolor=#fefefe
| 615615 ||  || — || August 29, 2006 || Catalina || CSS ||  || align=right data-sort-value="0.62" | 620 m || 
|-id=616 bgcolor=#fefefe
| 615616 ||  || — || February 3, 2008 || Kitt Peak || Spacewatch ||  || align=right data-sort-value="0.61" | 610 m || 
|-id=617 bgcolor=#fefefe
| 615617 ||  || — || October 19, 2003 || Kitt Peak || Spacewatch ||  || align=right data-sort-value="0.58" | 580 m || 
|-id=618 bgcolor=#fefefe
| 615618 ||  || — || October 19, 2003 || Apache Point || SDSS Collaboration ||  || align=right data-sort-value="0.53" | 530 m || 
|-id=619 bgcolor=#E9E9E9
| 615619 ||  || — || September 14, 2007 || Mount Lemmon || Mount Lemmon Survey ||  || align=right data-sort-value="0.89" | 890 m || 
|-id=620 bgcolor=#E9E9E9
| 615620 ||  || — || May 21, 2006 || Kitt Peak || Spacewatch ||  || align=right | 1.4 km || 
|-id=621 bgcolor=#d6d6d6
| 615621 ||  || — || May 15, 2012 || Haleakala || Pan-STARRS ||  || align=right | 2.4 km || 
|-id=622 bgcolor=#d6d6d6
| 615622 ||  || — || October 26, 2009 || Mount Lemmon || Mount Lemmon Survey ||  || align=right | 3.0 km || 
|-id=623 bgcolor=#fefefe
| 615623 ||  || — || February 7, 2008 || Kitt Peak || Spacewatch ||  || align=right data-sort-value="0.62" | 620 m || 
|-id=624 bgcolor=#fefefe
| 615624 ||  || — || August 29, 2006 || Kitt Peak || Spacewatch ||  || align=right data-sort-value="0.53" | 530 m || 
|-id=625 bgcolor=#d6d6d6
| 615625 ||  || — || November 8, 2010 || Mount Lemmon || Mount Lemmon Survey || 7:4 || align=right | 3.0 km || 
|-id=626 bgcolor=#E9E9E9
| 615626 ||  || — || January 15, 2009 || Kitt Peak || Spacewatch ||  || align=right data-sort-value="0.87" | 870 m || 
|-id=627 bgcolor=#E9E9E9
| 615627 ||  || — || November 19, 2003 || Kitt Peak || Spacewatch ||  || align=right data-sort-value="0.90" | 900 m || 
|-id=628 bgcolor=#E9E9E9
| 615628 ||  || — || October 9, 2007 || Mount Lemmon || Mount Lemmon Survey ||  || align=right data-sort-value="0.79" | 790 m || 
|-id=629 bgcolor=#fefefe
| 615629 ||  || — || November 24, 2003 || Kitt Peak || Spacewatch ||  || align=right data-sort-value="0.50" | 500 m || 
|-id=630 bgcolor=#E9E9E9
| 615630 ||  || — || October 25, 2003 || Kitt Peak || Spacewatch ||  || align=right data-sort-value="0.67" | 670 m || 
|-id=631 bgcolor=#E9E9E9
| 615631 ||  || — || September 10, 2007 || Kitt Peak || Spacewatch ||  || align=right data-sort-value="0.60" | 600 m || 
|-id=632 bgcolor=#d6d6d6
| 615632 ||  || — || October 5, 2014 || Mount Lemmon || Mount Lemmon Survey ||  || align=right | 2.2 km || 
|-id=633 bgcolor=#d6d6d6
| 615633 ||  || — || February 10, 2016 || Haleakala || Pan-STARRS ||  || align=right | 2.6 km || 
|-id=634 bgcolor=#fefefe
| 615634 ||  || — || August 19, 2006 || Kitt Peak || Spacewatch ||  || align=right data-sort-value="0.61" | 610 m || 
|-id=635 bgcolor=#d6d6d6
| 615635 ||  || — || March 27, 2011 || Mount Lemmon || Mount Lemmon Survey ||  || align=right | 2.5 km || 
|-id=636 bgcolor=#d6d6d6
| 615636 ||  || — || November 15, 1998 || Kitt Peak || Spacewatch ||  || align=right | 2.2 km || 
|-id=637 bgcolor=#fefefe
| 615637 ||  || — || September 22, 2016 || Mount Lemmon || Mount Lemmon Survey ||  || align=right data-sort-value="0.49" | 490 m || 
|-id=638 bgcolor=#fefefe
| 615638 ||  || — || August 19, 2006 || Kitt Peak || Spacewatch ||  || align=right data-sort-value="0.53" | 530 m || 
|-id=639 bgcolor=#d6d6d6
| 615639 ||  || — || November 18, 2003 || Kitt Peak || Spacewatch ||  || align=right | 2.1 km || 
|-id=640 bgcolor=#d6d6d6
| 615640 ||  || — || November 29, 2014 || Mount Lemmon || Mount Lemmon Survey ||  || align=right | 1.9 km || 
|-id=641 bgcolor=#fefefe
| 615641 ||  || — || February 8, 2011 || Mount Lemmon || Mount Lemmon Survey ||  || align=right data-sort-value="0.46" | 460 m || 
|-id=642 bgcolor=#d6d6d6
| 615642 ||  || — || October 17, 2003 || Kitt Peak || Spacewatch ||  || align=right | 2.4 km || 
|-id=643 bgcolor=#E9E9E9
| 615643 ||  || — || October 27, 2003 || Kitt Peak || Spacewatch ||  || align=right | 1.0 km || 
|-id=644 bgcolor=#E9E9E9
| 615644 ||  || — || October 29, 2003 || Kitt Peak || Spacewatch ||  || align=right data-sort-value="0.89" | 890 m || 
|-id=645 bgcolor=#E9E9E9
| 615645 ||  || — || October 28, 2003 || Socorro || LINEAR ||  || align=right | 1.6 km || 
|-id=646 bgcolor=#fefefe
| 615646 ||  || — || October 22, 2003 || Socorro || LINEAR ||  || align=right data-sort-value="0.91" | 910 m || 
|-id=647 bgcolor=#E9E9E9
| 615647 ||  || — || November 16, 2003 || Kitt Peak || Spacewatch ||  || align=right data-sort-value="0.97" | 970 m || 
|-id=648 bgcolor=#fefefe
| 615648 ||  || — || November 18, 2003 || Kitt Peak || Spacewatch || H || align=right data-sort-value="0.68" | 680 m || 
|-id=649 bgcolor=#E9E9E9
| 615649 ||  || — || November 18, 2003 || Palomar || NEAT ||  || align=right | 1.4 km || 
|-id=650 bgcolor=#fefefe
| 615650 ||  || — || October 19, 2003 || Kitt Peak || Spacewatch ||  || align=right data-sort-value="0.56" | 560 m || 
|-id=651 bgcolor=#E9E9E9
| 615651 ||  || — || November 19, 2003 || Palomar || NEAT ||  || align=right | 2.0 km || 
|-id=652 bgcolor=#E9E9E9
| 615652 ||  || — || January 9, 2000 || Socorro || LINEAR ||  || align=right | 1.8 km || 
|-id=653 bgcolor=#E9E9E9
| 615653 ||  || — || October 17, 2003 || Kitt Peak || Spacewatch ||  || align=right data-sort-value="0.96" | 960 m || 
|-id=654 bgcolor=#d6d6d6
| 615654 ||  || — || November 19, 2003 || Kitt Peak || Spacewatch ||  || align=right | 2.5 km || 
|-id=655 bgcolor=#d6d6d6
| 615655 ||  || — || October 20, 2003 || Kitt Peak || Spacewatch ||  || align=right | 2.6 km || 
|-id=656 bgcolor=#d6d6d6
| 615656 ||  || — || October 16, 2003 || Kitt Peak || Spacewatch ||  || align=right | 2.3 km || 
|-id=657 bgcolor=#d6d6d6
| 615657 ||  || — || November 19, 2003 || Kitt Peak || Spacewatch ||  || align=right | 3.3 km || 
|-id=658 bgcolor=#d6d6d6
| 615658 ||  || — || November 20, 2003 || Kitt Peak || Spacewatch ||  || align=right | 2.4 km || 
|-id=659 bgcolor=#fefefe
| 615659 ||  || — || November 18, 2003 || Kitt Peak || Spacewatch ||  || align=right data-sort-value="0.45" | 450 m || 
|-id=660 bgcolor=#d6d6d6
| 615660 ||  || — || November 21, 2003 || Kitt Peak || Spacewatch ||  || align=right | 2.3 km || 
|-id=661 bgcolor=#d6d6d6
| 615661 ||  || — || October 17, 2003 || Kitt Peak || Spacewatch ||  || align=right | 2.7 km || 
|-id=662 bgcolor=#fefefe
| 615662 ||  || — || October 18, 2003 || Kitt Peak || Spacewatch ||  || align=right data-sort-value="0.67" | 670 m || 
|-id=663 bgcolor=#E9E9E9
| 615663 ||  || — || November 28, 2003 || Kitt Peak || Spacewatch ||  || align=right | 1.0 km || 
|-id=664 bgcolor=#d6d6d6
| 615664 ||  || — || November 20, 2003 || Kitt Peak || Kitt Peak Obs. ||  || align=right | 1.8 km || 
|-id=665 bgcolor=#fefefe
| 615665 ||  || — || October 17, 2003 || Kitt Peak || Spacewatch ||  || align=right data-sort-value="0.63" | 630 m || 
|-id=666 bgcolor=#d6d6d6
| 615666 ||  || — || November 23, 2003 || Kitt Peak || Kitt Peak Obs. ||  || align=right | 2.3 km || 
|-id=667 bgcolor=#fefefe
| 615667 ||  || — || November 19, 2003 || Kitt Peak || Spacewatch ||  || align=right data-sort-value="0.58" | 580 m || 
|-id=668 bgcolor=#fefefe
| 615668 ||  || — || March 29, 2012 || Kitt Peak || Spacewatch ||  || align=right data-sort-value="0.62" | 620 m || 
|-id=669 bgcolor=#fefefe
| 615669 ||  || — || December 13, 2010 || Kitt Peak || Spacewatch ||  || align=right data-sort-value="0.64" | 640 m || 
|-id=670 bgcolor=#d6d6d6
| 615670 ||  || — || November 26, 2003 || Kitt Peak || Spacewatch ||  || align=right | 2.8 km || 
|-id=671 bgcolor=#fefefe
| 615671 ||  || — || January 12, 2011 || Kitt Peak || Spacewatch ||  || align=right data-sort-value="0.67" | 670 m || 
|-id=672 bgcolor=#d6d6d6
| 615672 ||  || — || September 24, 2008 || Kitt Peak || Spacewatch ||  || align=right | 2.0 km || 
|-id=673 bgcolor=#E9E9E9
| 615673 ||  || — || May 5, 2005 || Palomar || NEAT ||  || align=right data-sort-value="0.91" | 910 m || 
|-id=674 bgcolor=#fefefe
| 615674 ||  || — || January 8, 2011 || Mount Lemmon || Mount Lemmon Survey ||  || align=right data-sort-value="0.71" | 710 m || 
|-id=675 bgcolor=#fefefe
| 615675 ||  || — || March 4, 2008 || Mount Lemmon || Mount Lemmon Survey ||  || align=right data-sort-value="0.57" | 570 m || 
|-id=676 bgcolor=#d6d6d6
| 615676 ||  || — || September 29, 2008 || Mount Lemmon || Mount Lemmon Survey ||  || align=right | 3.4 km || 
|-id=677 bgcolor=#fefefe
| 615677 ||  || — || February 24, 2008 || Kitt Peak || Spacewatch ||  || align=right data-sort-value="0.54" | 540 m || 
|-id=678 bgcolor=#E9E9E9
| 615678 ||  || — || November 16, 2003 || Kitt Peak || Spacewatch ||  || align=right data-sort-value="0.96" | 960 m || 
|-id=679 bgcolor=#fefefe
| 615679 ||  || — || August 30, 2006 || Anderson Mesa || LONEOS ||  || align=right data-sort-value="0.52" | 520 m || 
|-id=680 bgcolor=#E9E9E9
| 615680 ||  || — || October 26, 2011 || Haleakala || Pan-STARRS ||  || align=right data-sort-value="0.89" | 890 m || 
|-id=681 bgcolor=#E9E9E9
| 615681 ||  || — || February 22, 2009 || Kitt Peak || Spacewatch ||  || align=right data-sort-value="0.77" | 770 m || 
|-id=682 bgcolor=#d6d6d6
| 615682 ||  || — || October 1, 2008 || Mount Lemmon || Mount Lemmon Survey ||  || align=right | 2.0 km || 
|-id=683 bgcolor=#d6d6d6
| 615683 ||  || — || November 29, 2014 || Mount Lemmon || Mount Lemmon Survey ||  || align=right | 2.1 km || 
|-id=684 bgcolor=#d6d6d6
| 615684 ||  || — || October 27, 2008 || Mount Lemmon || Mount Lemmon Survey ||  || align=right | 2.5 km || 
|-id=685 bgcolor=#d6d6d6
| 615685 ||  || — || July 14, 2013 || Haleakala || Pan-STARRS ||  || align=right | 2.2 km || 
|-id=686 bgcolor=#d6d6d6
| 615686 ||  || — || September 23, 2008 || Kitt Peak || Spacewatch ||  || align=right | 2.3 km || 
|-id=687 bgcolor=#d6d6d6
| 615687 ||  || — || November 20, 2003 || Kitt Peak || Spacewatch ||  || align=right | 3.0 km || 
|-id=688 bgcolor=#d6d6d6
| 615688 ||  || — || December 13, 2015 || Haleakala || Pan-STARRS ||  || align=right | 2.2 km || 
|-id=689 bgcolor=#E9E9E9
| 615689 ||  || — || October 31, 2007 || Mount Lemmon || Mount Lemmon Survey ||  || align=right data-sort-value="0.91" | 910 m || 
|-id=690 bgcolor=#fefefe
| 615690 ||  || — || January 13, 2008 || Mount Lemmon || Mount Lemmon Survey ||  || align=right data-sort-value="0.58" | 580 m || 
|-id=691 bgcolor=#E9E9E9
| 615691 ||  || — || June 19, 2014 || Haleakala || Pan-STARRS ||  || align=right data-sort-value="0.74" | 740 m || 
|-id=692 bgcolor=#fefefe
| 615692 ||  || — || January 23, 2015 || Haleakala || Pan-STARRS ||  || align=right data-sort-value="0.62" | 620 m || 
|-id=693 bgcolor=#fefefe
| 615693 ||  || — || September 17, 2013 || Mount Lemmon || Mount Lemmon Survey ||  || align=right data-sort-value="0.61" | 610 m || 
|-id=694 bgcolor=#E9E9E9
| 615694 ||  || — || October 8, 2007 || Kitt Peak || Spacewatch ||  || align=right data-sort-value="0.88" | 880 m || 
|-id=695 bgcolor=#d6d6d6
| 615695 ||  || — || September 13, 2013 || Mount Lemmon || Mount Lemmon Survey ||  || align=right | 2.2 km || 
|-id=696 bgcolor=#d6d6d6
| 615696 ||  || — || March 3, 2016 || Mount Lemmon || Mount Lemmon Survey ||  || align=right | 2.0 km || 
|-id=697 bgcolor=#fefefe
| 615697 ||  || — || November 18, 2003 || Kitt Peak || Spacewatch ||  || align=right data-sort-value="0.57" | 570 m || 
|-id=698 bgcolor=#d6d6d6
| 615698 ||  || — || November 19, 2003 || Kitt Peak || Spacewatch ||  || align=right | 2.9 km || 
|-id=699 bgcolor=#d6d6d6
| 615699 ||  || — || August 29, 2014 || Kitt Peak || Spacewatch ||  || align=right | 3.4 km || 
|-id=700 bgcolor=#fefefe
| 615700 ||  || — || December 14, 2003 || Kitt Peak || Spacewatch ||  || align=right data-sort-value="0.56" | 560 m || 
|}

615701–615800 

|-bgcolor=#E9E9E9
| 615701 ||  || — || February 17, 2013 || Kitt Peak || Spacewatch ||  || align=right data-sort-value="0.80" | 800 m || 
|-id=702 bgcolor=#E9E9E9
| 615702 ||  || — || July 19, 2015 || Haleakala || Pan-STARRS ||  || align=right | 1.4 km || 
|-id=703 bgcolor=#E9E9E9
| 615703 ||  || — || November 2, 2011 || Kitt Peak || Spacewatch ||  || align=right data-sort-value="0.68" | 680 m || 
|-id=704 bgcolor=#d6d6d6
| 615704 ||  || — || October 10, 2008 || Mount Lemmon || Mount Lemmon Survey ||  || align=right | 2.5 km || 
|-id=705 bgcolor=#E9E9E9
| 615705 ||  || — || December 3, 2003 || Socorro || LINEAR ||  || align=right | 1.2 km || 
|-id=706 bgcolor=#d6d6d6
| 615706 ||  || — || November 26, 2003 || Kitt Peak || Spacewatch ||  || align=right | 3.2 km || 
|-id=707 bgcolor=#E9E9E9
| 615707 ||  || — || December 17, 2003 || Kitt Peak || Spacewatch ||  || align=right | 1.4 km || 
|-id=708 bgcolor=#E9E9E9
| 615708 ||  || — || November 19, 2003 || Catalina || CSS ||  || align=right | 1.2 km || 
|-id=709 bgcolor=#E9E9E9
| 615709 ||  || — || December 19, 2003 || Kitt Peak || Spacewatch ||  || align=right | 1.0 km || 
|-id=710 bgcolor=#d6d6d6
| 615710 ||  || — || December 17, 2003 || Kitt Peak || Spacewatch ||  || align=right | 2.4 km || 
|-id=711 bgcolor=#E9E9E9
| 615711 ||  || — || December 19, 2003 || Kitt Peak || Spacewatch ||  || align=right | 1.3 km || 
|-id=712 bgcolor=#d6d6d6
| 615712 ||  || — || October 6, 2008 || Mount Lemmon || Mount Lemmon Survey ||  || align=right | 2.8 km || 
|-id=713 bgcolor=#d6d6d6
| 615713 ||  || — || October 24, 2014 || Mount Lemmon || Mount Lemmon Survey ||  || align=right | 2.7 km || 
|-id=714 bgcolor=#fefefe
| 615714 ||  || — || January 21, 2015 || Haleakala || Pan-STARRS ||  || align=right data-sort-value="0.66" | 660 m || 
|-id=715 bgcolor=#d6d6d6
| 615715 ||  || — || November 18, 2014 || Mount Lemmon || Mount Lemmon Survey ||  || align=right | 2.2 km || 
|-id=716 bgcolor=#fefefe
| 615716 ||  || — || December 10, 2010 || Kitt Peak || Spacewatch ||  || align=right data-sort-value="0.52" | 520 m || 
|-id=717 bgcolor=#E9E9E9
| 615717 ||  || — || December 17, 2003 || Kitt Peak || Spacewatch ||  || align=right data-sort-value="0.98" | 980 m || 
|-id=718 bgcolor=#E9E9E9
| 615718 ||  || — || January 4, 2013 || Cerro Tololo-DECam || CTIO-DECam ||  || align=right | 1.1 km || 
|-id=719 bgcolor=#d6d6d6
| 615719 ||  || — || January 13, 2004 || Kitt Peak || Spacewatch ||  || align=right | 2.2 km || 
|-id=720 bgcolor=#E9E9E9
| 615720 ||  || — || September 12, 2007 || Mount Lemmon || Mount Lemmon Survey ||  || align=right | 1.0 km || 
|-id=721 bgcolor=#E9E9E9
| 615721 ||  || — || December 21, 2003 || Kitt Peak || Spacewatch ||  || align=right | 1.3 km || 
|-id=722 bgcolor=#E9E9E9
| 615722 ||  || — || December 29, 2003 || Kitt Peak || Spacewatch ||  || align=right | 1.2 km || 
|-id=723 bgcolor=#fefefe
| 615723 ||  || — || January 15, 2004 || Kitt Peak || Spacewatch ||  || align=right data-sort-value="0.70" | 700 m || 
|-id=724 bgcolor=#E9E9E9
| 615724 ||  || — || January 15, 2004 || Kitt Peak || Spacewatch ||  || align=right | 1.4 km || 
|-id=725 bgcolor=#E9E9E9
| 615725 ||  || — || March 21, 2009 || Mount Lemmon || Mount Lemmon Survey ||  || align=right | 1.1 km || 
|-id=726 bgcolor=#fefefe
| 615726 ||  || — || January 16, 2004 || Kitt Peak || Spacewatch ||  || align=right data-sort-value="0.50" | 500 m || 
|-id=727 bgcolor=#fefefe
| 615727 ||  || — || January 17, 2004 || Palomar || NEAT || H || align=right data-sort-value="0.75" | 750 m || 
|-id=728 bgcolor=#fefefe
| 615728 ||  || — || December 29, 2003 || Kitt Peak || Spacewatch ||  || align=right data-sort-value="0.66" | 660 m || 
|-id=729 bgcolor=#d6d6d6
| 615729 ||  || — || January 22, 2004 || Socorro || LINEAR ||  || align=right | 2.6 km || 
|-id=730 bgcolor=#E9E9E9
| 615730 ||  || — || January 23, 2004 || Anderson Mesa || LONEOS ||  || align=right | 2.5 km || 
|-id=731 bgcolor=#E9E9E9
| 615731 ||  || — || January 17, 2004 || Haleakala || AMOS ||  || align=right | 2.6 km || 
|-id=732 bgcolor=#d6d6d6
| 615732 ||  || — || January 28, 2004 || Kitt Peak || Spacewatch ||  || align=right | 2.9 km || 
|-id=733 bgcolor=#E9E9E9
| 615733 ||  || — || January 16, 2004 || Palomar || NEAT ||  || align=right | 1.7 km || 
|-id=734 bgcolor=#E9E9E9
| 615734 ||  || — || January 22, 2004 || Socorro || LINEAR ||  || align=right | 1.9 km || 
|-id=735 bgcolor=#E9E9E9
| 615735 ||  || — || January 16, 2004 || Kitt Peak || Spacewatch ||  || align=right | 1.5 km || 
|-id=736 bgcolor=#E9E9E9
| 615736 ||  || — || January 16, 2004 || Kitt Peak || Spacewatch ||  || align=right | 1.3 km || 
|-id=737 bgcolor=#d6d6d6
| 615737 ||  || — || December 17, 2003 || Kitt Peak || Spacewatch ||  || align=right | 3.6 km || 
|-id=738 bgcolor=#d6d6d6
| 615738 ||  || — || January 16, 2004 || Kitt Peak || Spacewatch ||  || align=right | 2.6 km || 
|-id=739 bgcolor=#E9E9E9
| 615739 ||  || — || January 16, 2004 || Kitt Peak || Spacewatch ||  || align=right | 1.5 km || 
|-id=740 bgcolor=#d6d6d6
| 615740 ||  || — || August 29, 2002 || Kitt Peak || Spacewatch ||  || align=right | 2.0 km || 
|-id=741 bgcolor=#fefefe
| 615741 ||  || — || January 16, 2004 || Kitt Peak || Spacewatch ||  || align=right data-sort-value="0.64" | 640 m || 
|-id=742 bgcolor=#E9E9E9
| 615742 ||  || — || January 18, 2004 || Palomar || NEAT ||  || align=right | 2.0 km || 
|-id=743 bgcolor=#E9E9E9
| 615743 ||  || — || December 29, 2003 || Kitt Peak || Spacewatch ||  || align=right | 1.1 km || 
|-id=744 bgcolor=#d6d6d6
| 615744 ||  || — || January 19, 2004 || Kitt Peak || Spacewatch ||  || align=right | 2.5 km || 
|-id=745 bgcolor=#d6d6d6
| 615745 ||  || — || January 19, 2004 || Kitt Peak || Spacewatch ||  || align=right | 2.6 km || 
|-id=746 bgcolor=#d6d6d6
| 615746 ||  || — || January 19, 2004 || Kitt Peak || Spacewatch ||  || align=right | 2.5 km || 
|-id=747 bgcolor=#E9E9E9
| 615747 ||  || — || January 28, 2004 || Kitt Peak || Spacewatch ||  || align=right | 1.5 km || 
|-id=748 bgcolor=#E9E9E9
| 615748 ||  || — || May 1, 2013 || Nogales || M. Schwartz, P. R. Holvorcem ||  || align=right data-sort-value="0.94" | 940 m || 
|-id=749 bgcolor=#fefefe
| 615749 ||  || — || October 4, 2016 || Mount Lemmon || Mount Lemmon Survey ||  || align=right data-sort-value="0.70" | 700 m || 
|-id=750 bgcolor=#d6d6d6
| 615750 ||  || — || January 28, 2004 || Kitt Peak || Spacewatch ||  || align=right | 2.8 km || 
|-id=751 bgcolor=#d6d6d6
| 615751 ||  || — || October 30, 2008 || Kitt Peak || Spacewatch ||  || align=right | 2.5 km || 
|-id=752 bgcolor=#fefefe
| 615752 ||  || — || January 27, 2004 || Kitt Peak || Spacewatch ||  || align=right data-sort-value="0.63" | 630 m || 
|-id=753 bgcolor=#fefefe
| 615753 ||  || — || October 27, 2017 || Mount Lemmon || Mount Lemmon Survey ||  || align=right data-sort-value="0.65" | 650 m || 
|-id=754 bgcolor=#fefefe
| 615754 ||  || — || September 29, 2013 || Kitt Peak || Spacewatch ||  || align=right data-sort-value="0.63" | 630 m || 
|-id=755 bgcolor=#E9E9E9
| 615755 ||  || — || January 30, 2004 || Kitt Peak || Spacewatch ||  || align=right | 1.3 km || 
|-id=756 bgcolor=#d6d6d6
| 615756 ||  || — || November 20, 2008 || Kitt Peak || Spacewatch ||  || align=right | 2.6 km || 
|-id=757 bgcolor=#d6d6d6
| 615757 ||  || — || January 16, 2015 || Haleakala || Pan-STARRS ||  || align=right | 2.6 km || 
|-id=758 bgcolor=#d6d6d6
| 615758 ||  || — || November 26, 2014 || Haleakala || Pan-STARRS ||  || align=right | 2.9 km || 
|-id=759 bgcolor=#d6d6d6
| 615759 ||  || — || May 1, 2011 || Haleakala || Pan-STARRS ||  || align=right | 2.8 km || 
|-id=760 bgcolor=#d6d6d6
| 615760 ||  || — || November 19, 2008 || Mount Lemmon || Mount Lemmon Survey ||  || align=right | 2.4 km || 
|-id=761 bgcolor=#E9E9E9
| 615761 ||  || — || June 20, 2015 || Haleakala || Pan-STARRS ||  || align=right | 1.1 km || 
|-id=762 bgcolor=#d6d6d6
| 615762 ||  || — || February 8, 2015 || Kitt Peak || Spacewatch ||  || align=right | 2.3 km || 
|-id=763 bgcolor=#E9E9E9
| 615763 ||  || — || January 19, 2004 || Kitt Peak || Spacewatch ||  || align=right | 1.0 km || 
|-id=764 bgcolor=#E9E9E9
| 615764 ||  || — || January 30, 2004 || Kitt Peak || Spacewatch ||  || align=right | 1.7 km || 
|-id=765 bgcolor=#fefefe
| 615765 ||  || — || February 10, 2004 || Nogales || P. R. Holvorcem, M. Schwartz ||  || align=right data-sort-value="0.78" | 780 m || 
|-id=766 bgcolor=#d6d6d6
| 615766 ||  || — || February 11, 2004 || Kitt Peak || Spacewatch ||  || align=right | 2.6 km || 
|-id=767 bgcolor=#d6d6d6
| 615767 ||  || — || January 28, 2004 || Kitt Peak || Spacewatch || Tj (2.93) || align=right | 3.5 km || 
|-id=768 bgcolor=#E9E9E9
| 615768 ||  || — || February 12, 2004 || Kitt Peak || Spacewatch ||  || align=right | 1.4 km || 
|-id=769 bgcolor=#fefefe
| 615769 ||  || — || February 12, 2004 || Kitt Peak || Spacewatch ||  || align=right data-sort-value="0.80" | 800 m || 
|-id=770 bgcolor=#E9E9E9
| 615770 ||  || — || February 12, 2004 || Kitt Peak || Spacewatch ||  || align=right | 1.5 km || 
|-id=771 bgcolor=#fefefe
| 615771 ||  || — || February 12, 2004 || Kitt Peak || Spacewatch ||  || align=right data-sort-value="0.58" | 580 m || 
|-id=772 bgcolor=#E9E9E9
| 615772 ||  || — || February 12, 2004 || Kitt Peak || Spacewatch ||  || align=right | 1.5 km || 
|-id=773 bgcolor=#E9E9E9
| 615773 ||  || — || August 29, 2006 || Kitt Peak || Spacewatch ||  || align=right | 1.1 km || 
|-id=774 bgcolor=#E9E9E9
| 615774 ||  || — || January 14, 2008 || Kitt Peak || Spacewatch ||  || align=right | 1.3 km || 
|-id=775 bgcolor=#d6d6d6
| 615775 ||  || — || December 21, 2014 || Haleakala || Pan-STARRS ||  || align=right | 2.5 km || 
|-id=776 bgcolor=#fefefe
| 615776 ||  || — || January 14, 2011 || Kitt Peak || Spacewatch ||  || align=right data-sort-value="0.47" | 470 m || 
|-id=777 bgcolor=#d6d6d6
| 615777 ||  || — || November 23, 2013 || Haleakala || Pan-STARRS ||  || align=right | 2.6 km || 
|-id=778 bgcolor=#E9E9E9
| 615778 ||  || — || October 14, 2015 || Kitt Peak || Spacewatch ||  || align=right | 1.1 km || 
|-id=779 bgcolor=#E9E9E9
| 615779 ||  || — || February 17, 2004 || Kitt Peak || Spacewatch ||  || align=right data-sort-value="0.92" | 920 m || 
|-id=780 bgcolor=#d6d6d6
| 615780 ||  || — || January 31, 2004 || Kitt Peak || Spacewatch || 3:2 || align=right | 3.1 km || 
|-id=781 bgcolor=#d6d6d6
| 615781 ||  || — || February 17, 2004 || Calar Alto || J. L. Ortiz, P. Santos-Sanz || 7:4 || align=right | 3.5 km || 
|-id=782 bgcolor=#fefefe
| 615782 ||  || — || March 27, 2011 || Mount Lemmon || Mount Lemmon Survey ||  || align=right data-sort-value="0.58" | 580 m || 
|-id=783 bgcolor=#E9E9E9
| 615783 ||  || — || June 21, 2014 || Mount Lemmon || Mount Lemmon Survey ||  || align=right | 1.7 km || 
|-id=784 bgcolor=#d6d6d6
| 615784 ||  || — || December 11, 2013 || Mount Lemmon || Mount Lemmon Survey ||  || align=right | 1.9 km || 
|-id=785 bgcolor=#d6d6d6
| 615785 ||  || — || November 1, 2008 || Kitt Peak || Spacewatch ||  || align=right | 2.4 km || 
|-id=786 bgcolor=#fefefe
| 615786 ||  || — || November 20, 2017 || Haleakala || Pan-STARRS ||  || align=right data-sort-value="0.62" | 620 m || 
|-id=787 bgcolor=#d6d6d6
| 615787 ||  || — || October 1, 1995 || Kitt Peak || Spacewatch ||  || align=right | 2.7 km || 
|-id=788 bgcolor=#d6d6d6
| 615788 ||  || — || January 20, 2015 || Haleakala || Pan-STARRS ||  || align=right | 2.0 km || 
|-id=789 bgcolor=#d6d6d6
| 615789 ||  || — || July 10, 2018 || Haleakala || Pan-STARRS || Tj (2.93) || align=right | 2.9 km || 
|-id=790 bgcolor=#E9E9E9
| 615790 ||  || — || February 26, 2004 || Kitt Peak || M. W. Buie, D. E. Trilling ||  || align=right | 1.1 km || 
|-id=791 bgcolor=#fefefe
| 615791 ||  || — || August 30, 2005 || Kitt Peak || Spacewatch ||  || align=right data-sort-value="0.66" | 660 m || 
|-id=792 bgcolor=#d6d6d6
| 615792 ||  || — || December 4, 2008 || Kitt Peak || Spacewatch ||  || align=right | 2.2 km || 
|-id=793 bgcolor=#d6d6d6
| 615793 ||  || — || September 29, 2008 || Mount Lemmon || Mount Lemmon Survey ||  || align=right | 2.5 km || 
|-id=794 bgcolor=#d6d6d6
| 615794 ||  || — || February 18, 2004 || Kitt Peak || Spacewatch ||  || align=right | 1.8 km || 
|-id=795 bgcolor=#E9E9E9
| 615795 ||  || — || March 15, 2004 || Nogales || P. R. Holvorcem, M. Schwartz ||  || align=right data-sort-value="0.95" | 950 m || 
|-id=796 bgcolor=#E9E9E9
| 615796 ||  || — || February 17, 2004 || Socorro || LINEAR ||  || align=right | 1.5 km || 
|-id=797 bgcolor=#fefefe
| 615797 ||  || — || February 19, 2004 || Haleakala || AMOS ||  || align=right data-sort-value="0.80" | 800 m || 
|-id=798 bgcolor=#fefefe
| 615798 ||  || — || March 14, 2004 || Kitt Peak || Spacewatch ||  || align=right data-sort-value="0.68" | 680 m || 
|-id=799 bgcolor=#E9E9E9
| 615799 ||  || — || March 15, 2004 || Kitt Peak || Spacewatch ||  || align=right | 1.2 km || 
|-id=800 bgcolor=#fefefe
| 615800 ||  || — || March 15, 2004 || Kitt Peak || Spacewatch ||  || align=right data-sort-value="0.65" | 650 m || 
|}

615801–615900 

|-bgcolor=#E9E9E9
| 615801 ||  || — || March 15, 2004 || Kitt Peak || Spacewatch ||  || align=right | 1.1 km || 
|-id=802 bgcolor=#fefefe
| 615802 ||  || — || March 15, 2004 || Kitt Peak || Spacewatch ||  || align=right data-sort-value="0.67" | 670 m || 
|-id=803 bgcolor=#d6d6d6
| 615803 ||  || — || February 11, 2016 || Haleakala || Pan-STARRS ||  || align=right | 2.4 km || 
|-id=804 bgcolor=#fefefe
| 615804 ||  || — || March 19, 2004 || Mount Graham || W. H. Ryan, C. T. Martinez ||  || align=right data-sort-value="0.64" | 640 m || 
|-id=805 bgcolor=#fefefe
| 615805 ||  || — || March 17, 2004 || Kitt Peak || Spacewatch ||  || align=right data-sort-value="0.56" | 560 m || 
|-id=806 bgcolor=#fefefe
| 615806 ||  || — || March 26, 2004 || Socorro || LINEAR ||  || align=right data-sort-value="0.94" | 940 m || 
|-id=807 bgcolor=#fefefe
| 615807 ||  || — || March 17, 2004 || Kitt Peak || Spacewatch ||  || align=right data-sort-value="0.59" | 590 m || 
|-id=808 bgcolor=#fefefe
| 615808 ||  || — || March 17, 2004 || Palomar || NEAT ||  || align=right | 1.2 km || 
|-id=809 bgcolor=#E9E9E9
| 615809 ||  || — || March 17, 2004 || Kitt Peak || Spacewatch ||  || align=right | 1.9 km || 
|-id=810 bgcolor=#fefefe
| 615810 ||  || — || December 11, 2013 || Haleakala || Pan-STARRS ||  || align=right data-sort-value="0.90" | 900 m || 
|-id=811 bgcolor=#fefefe
| 615811 ||  || — || March 18, 2004 || Kitt Peak || Spacewatch ||  || align=right data-sort-value="0.85" | 850 m || 
|-id=812 bgcolor=#E9E9E9
| 615812 ||  || — || April 25, 2000 || Anderson Mesa || LONEOS ||  || align=right | 1.4 km || 
|-id=813 bgcolor=#d6d6d6
| 615813 ||  || — || March 15, 2004 || Kitt Peak || Spacewatch ||  || align=right | 2.6 km || 
|-id=814 bgcolor=#fefefe
| 615814 ||  || — || March 23, 2004 || Kitt Peak || Spacewatch ||  || align=right data-sort-value="0.69" | 690 m || 
|-id=815 bgcolor=#fefefe
| 615815 ||  || — || March 26, 2004 || Socorro || LINEAR ||  || align=right data-sort-value="0.83" | 830 m || 
|-id=816 bgcolor=#E9E9E9
| 615816 ||  || — || March 26, 2004 || Kitt Peak || I. dell'Antonio ||  || align=right | 1.6 km || 
|-id=817 bgcolor=#E9E9E9
| 615817 ||  || — || March 17, 2004 || Kitt Peak || Spacewatch ||  || align=right | 1.8 km || 
|-id=818 bgcolor=#E9E9E9
| 615818 ||  || — || March 17, 2004 || Kitt Peak || Spacewatch ||  || align=right | 1.3 km || 
|-id=819 bgcolor=#fefefe
| 615819 ||  || — || April 18, 2007 || Mount Lemmon || Mount Lemmon Survey || H || align=right data-sort-value="0.61" | 610 m || 
|-id=820 bgcolor=#E9E9E9
| 615820 ||  || — || September 26, 2006 || Mount Lemmon || Mount Lemmon Survey ||  || align=right | 1.4 km || 
|-id=821 bgcolor=#fefefe
| 615821 ||  || — || March 29, 2004 || Kitt Peak || Spacewatch ||  || align=right data-sort-value="0.64" | 640 m || 
|-id=822 bgcolor=#fefefe
| 615822 ||  || — || February 13, 2011 || Mount Lemmon || Mount Lemmon Survey ||  || align=right data-sort-value="0.55" | 550 m || 
|-id=823 bgcolor=#fefefe
| 615823 ||  || — || February 26, 2011 || Mount Lemmon || Mount Lemmon Survey ||  || align=right data-sort-value="0.63" | 630 m || 
|-id=824 bgcolor=#fefefe
| 615824 ||  || — || September 18, 1995 || Kitt Peak || Spacewatch ||  || align=right data-sort-value="0.63" | 630 m || 
|-id=825 bgcolor=#fefefe
| 615825 ||  || — || November 29, 2013 || Mount Lemmon || Mount Lemmon Survey ||  || align=right data-sort-value="0.60" | 600 m || 
|-id=826 bgcolor=#fefefe
| 615826 ||  || — || March 27, 2004 || Kitt Peak || Spacewatch ||  || align=right data-sort-value="0.63" | 630 m || 
|-id=827 bgcolor=#d6d6d6
| 615827 ||  || — || March 7, 2016 || Haleakala || Pan-STARRS ||  || align=right | 2.3 km || 
|-id=828 bgcolor=#d6d6d6
| 615828 ||  || — || November 21, 2008 || Kitt Peak || Spacewatch ||  || align=right | 3.0 km || 
|-id=829 bgcolor=#E9E9E9
| 615829 ||  || — || January 19, 2017 || Mount Lemmon || Mount Lemmon Survey ||  || align=right | 1.2 km || 
|-id=830 bgcolor=#E9E9E9
| 615830 ||  || — || April 12, 2004 || Kitt Peak || Spacewatch ||  || align=right data-sort-value="0.67" | 670 m || 
|-id=831 bgcolor=#E9E9E9
| 615831 ||  || — || April 12, 2004 || Kitt Peak || Spacewatch ||  || align=right | 1.8 km || 
|-id=832 bgcolor=#fefefe
| 615832 ||  || — || April 13, 2004 || Kitt Peak || Spacewatch || H || align=right data-sort-value="0.61" | 610 m || 
|-id=833 bgcolor=#E9E9E9
| 615833 ||  || — || April 13, 2004 || Kitt Peak || Spacewatch ||  || align=right | 1.1 km || 
|-id=834 bgcolor=#fefefe
| 615834 ||  || — || April 13, 2004 || Kitt Peak || Spacewatch ||  || align=right data-sort-value="0.48" | 480 m || 
|-id=835 bgcolor=#E9E9E9
| 615835 ||  || — || April 13, 2004 || Kitt Peak || Spacewatch ||  || align=right | 1.9 km || 
|-id=836 bgcolor=#fefefe
| 615836 ||  || — || April 13, 2004 || Kitt Peak || Spacewatch ||  || align=right data-sort-value="0.64" | 640 m || 
|-id=837 bgcolor=#fefefe
| 615837 ||  || — || October 5, 2002 || Palomar || NEAT ||  || align=right data-sort-value="0.82" | 820 m || 
|-id=838 bgcolor=#d6d6d6
| 615838 ||  || — || January 4, 2014 || Mount Lemmon || Mount Lemmon Survey ||  || align=right | 2.9 km || 
|-id=839 bgcolor=#fefefe
| 615839 ||  || — || April 13, 2004 || Kitt Peak || Spacewatch ||  || align=right data-sort-value="0.54" | 540 m || 
|-id=840 bgcolor=#fefefe
| 615840 ||  || — || May 21, 2015 || Haleakala || Pan-STARRS ||  || align=right data-sort-value="0.57" | 570 m || 
|-id=841 bgcolor=#E9E9E9
| 615841 ||  || — || April 16, 2004 || Kitt Peak || Spacewatch ||  || align=right | 1.3 km || 
|-id=842 bgcolor=#fefefe
| 615842 ||  || — || April 20, 2004 || Kitt Peak || Spacewatch ||  || align=right data-sort-value="0.58" | 580 m || 
|-id=843 bgcolor=#fefefe
| 615843 ||  || — || April 22, 2004 || Kitt Peak || Spacewatch ||  || align=right data-sort-value="0.59" | 590 m || 
|-id=844 bgcolor=#fefefe
| 615844 ||  || — || December 3, 2013 || Haleakala || Pan-STARRS ||  || align=right data-sort-value="0.76" | 760 m || 
|-id=845 bgcolor=#E9E9E9
| 615845 ||  || — || May 10, 2004 || Palomar || NEAT ||  || align=right | 2.4 km || 
|-id=846 bgcolor=#E9E9E9
| 615846 ||  || — || May 11, 2004 || Anderson Mesa || LONEOS ||  || align=right | 2.3 km || 
|-id=847 bgcolor=#fefefe
| 615847 ||  || — || May 14, 2004 || Kitt Peak || Spacewatch ||  || align=right data-sort-value="0.97" | 970 m || 
|-id=848 bgcolor=#fefefe
| 615848 ||  || — || February 25, 2011 || Mount Lemmon || Mount Lemmon Survey ||  || align=right data-sort-value="0.70" | 700 m || 
|-id=849 bgcolor=#E9E9E9
| 615849 ||  || — || May 19, 2004 || Wrightwood || J. W. Young ||  || align=right | 1.4 km || 
|-id=850 bgcolor=#E9E9E9
| 615850 ||  || — || November 23, 2006 || Mount Lemmon || Mount Lemmon Survey ||  || align=right | 1.2 km || 
|-id=851 bgcolor=#E9E9E9
| 615851 ||  || — || May 17, 2004 || Bergisch Gladbach || W. Bickel ||  || align=right | 2.0 km || 
|-id=852 bgcolor=#E9E9E9
| 615852 ||  || — || June 13, 2004 || Kitt Peak || Spacewatch ||  || align=right | 2.7 km || 
|-id=853 bgcolor=#E9E9E9
| 615853 ||  || — || June 12, 2004 || Kitt Peak || Spacewatch ||  || align=right | 1.6 km || 
|-id=854 bgcolor=#fefefe
| 615854 ||  || — || October 19, 2010 || Mount Lemmon || Mount Lemmon Survey || H || align=right data-sort-value="0.61" | 610 m || 
|-id=855 bgcolor=#E9E9E9
| 615855 ||  || — || August 18, 2009 || Kitt Peak || Spacewatch ||  || align=right | 1.7 km || 
|-id=856 bgcolor=#E9E9E9
| 615856 ||  || — || July 11, 2004 || Socorro || LINEAR ||  || align=right data-sort-value="0.98" | 980 m || 
|-id=857 bgcolor=#E9E9E9
| 615857 ||  || — || July 16, 2004 || Socorro || LINEAR ||  || align=right | 1.2 km || 
|-id=858 bgcolor=#E9E9E9
| 615858 ||  || — || July 25, 2004 || Anderson Mesa || LONEOS ||  || align=right | 1.2 km || 
|-id=859 bgcolor=#fefefe
| 615859 ||  || — || August 5, 2004 || Palomar || NEAT ||  || align=right | 1.1 km || 
|-id=860 bgcolor=#d6d6d6
| 615860 ||  || — || August 7, 2004 || Palomar || NEAT ||  || align=right | 2.9 km || 
|-id=861 bgcolor=#E9E9E9
| 615861 ||  || — || August 7, 2004 || Palomar || NEAT ||  || align=right | 2.0 km || 
|-id=862 bgcolor=#E9E9E9
| 615862 ||  || — || August 9, 2004 || Anderson Mesa || LONEOS ||  || align=right | 2.7 km || 
|-id=863 bgcolor=#E9E9E9
| 615863 ||  || — || August 11, 2004 || Socorro || LINEAR ||  || align=right | 2.2 km || 
|-id=864 bgcolor=#fefefe
| 615864 ||  || — || August 12, 2004 || Socorro || LINEAR ||  || align=right data-sort-value="0.70" | 700 m || 
|-id=865 bgcolor=#E9E9E9
| 615865 ||  || — || April 14, 2008 || Mount Lemmon || Mount Lemmon Survey ||  || align=right | 1.6 km || 
|-id=866 bgcolor=#fefefe
| 615866 ||  || — || September 9, 2008 || Mount Lemmon || Mount Lemmon Survey ||  || align=right data-sort-value="0.73" | 730 m || 
|-id=867 bgcolor=#fefefe
| 615867 ||  || — || October 25, 2008 || Catalina || CSS ||  || align=right data-sort-value="0.67" | 670 m || 
|-id=868 bgcolor=#E9E9E9
| 615868 ||  || — || October 31, 2005 || Kitt Peak || Spacewatch ||  || align=right | 2.1 km || 
|-id=869 bgcolor=#E9E9E9
| 615869 ||  || — || October 28, 2014 || Haleakala || Pan-STARRS ||  || align=right | 2.0 km || 
|-id=870 bgcolor=#fefefe
| 615870 ||  || — || July 16, 2004 || Cerro Tololo || Cerro Tololo Obs. ||  || align=right data-sort-value="0.60" | 600 m || 
|-id=871 bgcolor=#d6d6d6
| 615871 ||  || — || April 28, 2003 || Kitt Peak || Spacewatch ||  || align=right | 3.5 km || 
|-id=872 bgcolor=#E9E9E9
| 615872 ||  || — || August 20, 2004 || Kitt Peak || Spacewatch ||  || align=right | 2.3 km || 
|-id=873 bgcolor=#fefefe
| 615873 ||  || — || August 21, 2008 || Kitt Peak || Spacewatch ||  || align=right data-sort-value="0.67" | 670 m || 
|-id=874 bgcolor=#fefefe
| 615874 ||  || — || July 16, 2004 || Siding Spring || SSS ||  || align=right | 1.2 km || 
|-id=875 bgcolor=#d6d6d6
| 615875 ||  || — || August 22, 2004 || Kitt Peak || Spacewatch ||  || align=right | 2.1 km || 
|-id=876 bgcolor=#d6d6d6
| 615876 ||  || — || September 8, 2016 || Haleakala || Pan-STARRS ||  || align=right | 3.8 km || 
|-id=877 bgcolor=#E9E9E9
| 615877 ||  || — || September 7, 2004 || Socorro || LINEAR ||  || align=right | 1.5 km || 
|-id=878 bgcolor=#fefefe
| 615878 ||  || — || September 8, 2004 || Socorro || LINEAR ||  || align=right data-sort-value="0.74" | 740 m || 
|-id=879 bgcolor=#fefefe
| 615879 ||  || — || September 8, 2004 || Socorro || LINEAR ||  || align=right data-sort-value="0.68" | 680 m || 
|-id=880 bgcolor=#d6d6d6
| 615880 ||  || — || September 7, 2004 || Kitt Peak || Spacewatch ||  || align=right | 2.0 km || 
|-id=881 bgcolor=#E9E9E9
| 615881 ||  || — || August 22, 2004 || Kitt Peak || Spacewatch ||  || align=right data-sort-value="0.92" | 920 m || 
|-id=882 bgcolor=#fefefe
| 615882 ||  || — || August 16, 2004 || Stony Ridge ||  ||  || align=right data-sort-value="0.91" | 910 m || 
|-id=883 bgcolor=#fefefe
| 615883 ||  || — || September 7, 2004 || Kitt Peak || Spacewatch ||  || align=right data-sort-value="0.65" | 650 m || 
|-id=884 bgcolor=#d6d6d6
| 615884 ||  || — || September 7, 2004 || Kitt Peak || Spacewatch ||  || align=right | 2.1 km || 
|-id=885 bgcolor=#FA8072
| 615885 ||  || — || September 28, 2001 || Palomar || NEAT ||  || align=right data-sort-value="0.48" | 480 m || 
|-id=886 bgcolor=#fefefe
| 615886 ||  || — || September 11, 2004 || Socorro || LINEAR ||  || align=right data-sort-value="0.98" | 980 m || 
|-id=887 bgcolor=#fefefe
| 615887 ||  || — || September 10, 2004 || Kitt Peak || Spacewatch ||  || align=right data-sort-value="0.74" | 740 m || 
|-id=888 bgcolor=#fefefe
| 615888 ||  || — || September 10, 2004 || Kitt Peak || Spacewatch ||  || align=right data-sort-value="0.57" | 570 m || 
|-id=889 bgcolor=#E9E9E9
| 615889 ||  || — || September 7, 2004 || Kitt Peak || Spacewatch ||  || align=right data-sort-value="0.72" | 720 m || 
|-id=890 bgcolor=#fefefe
| 615890 ||  || — || September 10, 2004 || Socorro || LINEAR ||  || align=right data-sort-value="0.71" | 710 m || 
|-id=891 bgcolor=#fefefe
| 615891 ||  || — || September 10, 2004 || Kitt Peak || Spacewatch ||  || align=right data-sort-value="0.58" | 580 m || 
|-id=892 bgcolor=#d6d6d6
| 615892 ||  || — || September 10, 2004 || Kitt Peak || Spacewatch ||  || align=right | 1.9 km || 
|-id=893 bgcolor=#d6d6d6
| 615893 ||  || — || September 10, 2004 || Kitt Peak || Spacewatch ||  || align=right | 1.7 km || 
|-id=894 bgcolor=#d6d6d6
| 615894 ||  || — || September 11, 2004 || Kitt Peak || Spacewatch ||  || align=right | 1.7 km || 
|-id=895 bgcolor=#d6d6d6
| 615895 ||  || — || September 11, 2004 || Kitt Peak || Spacewatch ||  || align=right | 1.8 km || 
|-id=896 bgcolor=#fefefe
| 615896 ||  || — || September 11, 2004 || Kitt Peak || Spacewatch ||  || align=right data-sort-value="0.69" | 690 m || 
|-id=897 bgcolor=#d6d6d6
| 615897 ||  || — || September 15, 2004 || Kitt Peak || Spacewatch ||  || align=right | 1.8 km || 
|-id=898 bgcolor=#d6d6d6
| 615898 ||  || — || September 15, 2004 || Kitt Peak || Spacewatch ||  || align=right | 2.9 km || 
|-id=899 bgcolor=#d6d6d6
| 615899 ||  || — || March 20, 2002 || Kitt Peak || Kitt Peak Obs. ||  || align=right | 1.8 km || 
|-id=900 bgcolor=#E9E9E9
| 615900 ||  || — || September 11, 2004 || Kitt Peak || Spacewatch ||  || align=right | 2.1 km || 
|}

615901–616000 

|-bgcolor=#fefefe
| 615901 ||  || — || September 11, 2004 || Kitt Peak || Spacewatch ||  || align=right data-sort-value="0.63" | 630 m || 
|-id=902 bgcolor=#fefefe
| 615902 ||  || — || September 15, 2004 || Siding Spring || SSS || H || align=right data-sort-value="0.73" | 730 m || 
|-id=903 bgcolor=#E9E9E9
| 615903 ||  || — || September 12, 2004 || Kitt Peak || Spacewatch ||  || align=right | 1.9 km || 
|-id=904 bgcolor=#E9E9E9
| 615904 ||  || — || August 20, 2004 || Catalina || CSS ||  || align=right | 1.0 km || 
|-id=905 bgcolor=#E9E9E9
| 615905 ||  || — || September 15, 2012 || Kitt Peak || Spacewatch ||  || align=right | 1.1 km || 
|-id=906 bgcolor=#fefefe
| 615906 ||  || — || August 3, 2000 || Kitt Peak || Spacewatch ||  || align=right data-sort-value="0.86" | 860 m || 
|-id=907 bgcolor=#d6d6d6
| 615907 ||  || — || March 16, 2012 || Haleakala || Pan-STARRS ||  || align=right | 2.6 km || 
|-id=908 bgcolor=#fefefe
| 615908 ||  || — || September 20, 2008 || Kitt Peak || Spacewatch ||  || align=right data-sort-value="0.78" | 780 m || 
|-id=909 bgcolor=#fefefe
| 615909 ||  || — || October 6, 2008 || Mount Lemmon || Mount Lemmon Survey ||  || align=right data-sort-value="0.66" | 660 m || 
|-id=910 bgcolor=#E9E9E9
| 615910 ||  || — || September 20, 2009 || Kitt Peak || Spacewatch ||  || align=right | 1.9 km || 
|-id=911 bgcolor=#d6d6d6
| 615911 ||  || — || August 17, 2009 || Kitt Peak || Spacewatch ||  || align=right | 2.0 km || 
|-id=912 bgcolor=#fefefe
| 615912 ||  || — || June 25, 2015 || Haleakala || Pan-STARRS ||  || align=right data-sort-value="0.69" | 690 m || 
|-id=913 bgcolor=#fefefe
| 615913 ||  || — || April 27, 2011 || Kitt Peak || Spacewatch ||  || align=right data-sort-value="0.64" | 640 m || 
|-id=914 bgcolor=#fefefe
| 615914 ||  || — || September 17, 2004 || Piszkesteto || K. Sárneczky || H || align=right data-sort-value="0.74" | 740 m || 
|-id=915 bgcolor=#fefefe
| 615915 ||  || — || September 4, 2004 || Palomar || NEAT || H || align=right data-sort-value="0.91" | 910 m || 
|-id=916 bgcolor=#fefefe
| 615916 ||  || — || September 17, 2004 || Kitt Peak || Spacewatch ||  || align=right data-sort-value="0.59" | 590 m || 
|-id=917 bgcolor=#E9E9E9
| 615917 ||  || — || August 21, 2004 || Siding Spring || SSS ||  || align=right | 2.3 km || 
|-id=918 bgcolor=#fefefe
| 615918 ||  || — || September 17, 2004 || Anderson Mesa || LONEOS ||  || align=right data-sort-value="0.73" | 730 m || 
|-id=919 bgcolor=#fefefe
| 615919 ||  || — || September 17, 2004 || Kitt Peak || Spacewatch ||  || align=right data-sort-value="0.51" | 510 m || 
|-id=920 bgcolor=#fefefe
| 615920 ||  || — || September 21, 2004 || Kitt Peak || Spacewatch ||  || align=right data-sort-value="0.64" | 640 m || 
|-id=921 bgcolor=#fefefe
| 615921 ||  || — || September 16, 2004 || Kitt Peak || Spacewatch ||  || align=right data-sort-value="0.57" | 570 m || 
|-id=922 bgcolor=#fefefe
| 615922 ||  || — || September 16, 2004 || Kitt Peak || Spacewatch ||  || align=right data-sort-value="0.70" | 700 m || 
|-id=923 bgcolor=#E9E9E9
| 615923 ||  || — || September 9, 2004 || Socorro || LINEAR ||  || align=right | 1.7 km || 
|-id=924 bgcolor=#fefefe
| 615924 ||  || — || September 18, 2004 || Socorro || LINEAR ||  || align=right data-sort-value="0.70" | 700 m || 
|-id=925 bgcolor=#fefefe
| 615925 ||  || — || September 6, 2008 || Mount Lemmon || Mount Lemmon Survey ||  || align=right data-sort-value="0.72" | 720 m || 
|-id=926 bgcolor=#d6d6d6
| 615926 ||  || — || October 4, 2004 || Kitt Peak || Spacewatch ||  || align=right | 2.3 km || 
|-id=927 bgcolor=#d6d6d6
| 615927 ||  || — || October 5, 2004 || Kitt Peak || Spacewatch ||  || align=right | 2.2 km || 
|-id=928 bgcolor=#fefefe
| 615928 ||  || — || October 5, 2004 || Kitt Peak || Spacewatch ||  || align=right data-sort-value="0.75" | 750 m || 
|-id=929 bgcolor=#d6d6d6
| 615929 ||  || — || October 7, 2004 || Kitt Peak || Spacewatch ||  || align=right | 1.8 km || 
|-id=930 bgcolor=#fefefe
| 615930 ||  || — || October 7, 2004 || Socorro || LINEAR ||  || align=right data-sort-value="0.68" | 680 m || 
|-id=931 bgcolor=#fefefe
| 615931 ||  || — || October 5, 2004 || Kitt Peak || Spacewatch ||  || align=right data-sort-value="0.67" | 670 m || 
|-id=932 bgcolor=#d6d6d6
| 615932 ||  || — || September 22, 2004 || Kitt Peak || Spacewatch ||  || align=right | 2.1 km || 
|-id=933 bgcolor=#fefefe
| 615933 ||  || — || October 6, 2004 || Kitt Peak || Spacewatch ||  || align=right data-sort-value="0.66" | 660 m || 
|-id=934 bgcolor=#fefefe
| 615934 ||  || — || October 6, 2004 || Kitt Peak || Spacewatch ||  || align=right data-sort-value="0.71" | 710 m || 
|-id=935 bgcolor=#fefefe
| 615935 ||  || — || October 6, 2004 || Kitt Peak || Spacewatch ||  || align=right data-sort-value="0.63" | 630 m || 
|-id=936 bgcolor=#fefefe
| 615936 ||  || — || October 7, 2004 || Kitt Peak || Spacewatch ||  || align=right data-sort-value="0.60" | 600 m || 
|-id=937 bgcolor=#fefefe
| 615937 ||  || — || October 9, 2004 || Socorro || LINEAR ||  || align=right data-sort-value="0.91" | 910 m || 
|-id=938 bgcolor=#fefefe
| 615938 ||  || — || November 18, 2001 || Kitt Peak || Spacewatch ||  || align=right data-sort-value="0.44" | 440 m || 
|-id=939 bgcolor=#E9E9E9
| 615939 ||  || — || October 9, 2004 || Kitt Peak || Spacewatch ||  || align=right data-sort-value="0.60" | 600 m || 
|-id=940 bgcolor=#fefefe
| 615940 ||  || — || October 8, 2004 || Kitt Peak || Spacewatch ||  || align=right data-sort-value="0.60" | 600 m || 
|-id=941 bgcolor=#fefefe
| 615941 ||  || — || October 8, 2004 || Kitt Peak || Spacewatch ||  || align=right data-sort-value="0.57" | 570 m || 
|-id=942 bgcolor=#fefefe
| 615942 ||  || — || October 8, 2004 || Kitt Peak || Spacewatch || H || align=right data-sort-value="0.52" | 520 m || 
|-id=943 bgcolor=#fefefe
| 615943 ||  || — || October 8, 2004 || Kitt Peak || Spacewatch ||  || align=right data-sort-value="0.61" | 610 m || 
|-id=944 bgcolor=#E9E9E9
| 615944 ||  || — || October 7, 2004 || Kitt Peak || Spacewatch ||  || align=right data-sort-value="0.94" | 940 m || 
|-id=945 bgcolor=#d6d6d6
| 615945 ||  || — || October 9, 2004 || Kitt Peak || Spacewatch ||  || align=right | 1.9 km || 
|-id=946 bgcolor=#fefefe
| 615946 ||  || — || October 9, 2004 || Kitt Peak || Spacewatch ||  || align=right data-sort-value="0.84" | 840 m || 
|-id=947 bgcolor=#fefefe
| 615947 ||  || — || October 11, 2004 || Kitt Peak || Spacewatch ||  || align=right data-sort-value="0.58" | 580 m || 
|-id=948 bgcolor=#d6d6d6
| 615948 ||  || — || October 10, 2004 || Kitt Peak || Spacewatch ||  || align=right | 2.0 km || 
|-id=949 bgcolor=#d6d6d6
| 615949 ||  || — || October 8, 2004 || Kitt Peak || Spacewatch ||  || align=right | 1.8 km || 
|-id=950 bgcolor=#E9E9E9
| 615950 ||  || — || October 10, 2004 || Kitt Peak || Spacewatch ||  || align=right data-sort-value="0.65" | 650 m || 
|-id=951 bgcolor=#fefefe
| 615951 ||  || — || October 14, 2004 || Palomar || NEAT ||  || align=right | 1.2 km || 
|-id=952 bgcolor=#fefefe
| 615952 ||  || — || October 9, 2004 || Kitt Peak || Spacewatch ||  || align=right data-sort-value="0.65" | 650 m || 
|-id=953 bgcolor=#E9E9E9
| 615953 ||  || — || October 15, 2004 || Mount Lemmon || Mount Lemmon Survey ||  || align=right | 2.4 km || 
|-id=954 bgcolor=#fefefe
| 615954 ||  || — || December 31, 2005 || Kitt Peak || Spacewatch ||  || align=right data-sort-value="0.74" | 740 m || 
|-id=955 bgcolor=#fefefe
| 615955 ||  || — || October 7, 2004 || Kitt Peak || Spacewatch ||  || align=right data-sort-value="0.44" | 440 m || 
|-id=956 bgcolor=#fefefe
| 615956 ||  || — || October 23, 2008 || Mount Lemmon || Mount Lemmon Survey ||  || align=right data-sort-value="0.62" | 620 m || 
|-id=957 bgcolor=#fefefe
| 615957 ||  || — || January 23, 2006 || Kitt Peak || Spacewatch ||  || align=right data-sort-value="0.68" | 680 m || 
|-id=958 bgcolor=#d6d6d6
| 615958 ||  || — || September 12, 2009 || Kitt Peak || Spacewatch ||  || align=right | 2.0 km || 
|-id=959 bgcolor=#fefefe
| 615959 ||  || — || March 13, 2013 || Mount Lemmon || Mount Lemmon Survey ||  || align=right data-sort-value="0.52" | 520 m || 
|-id=960 bgcolor=#d6d6d6
| 615960 ||  || — || October 17, 2014 || Kitt Peak || Spacewatch ||  || align=right | 1.8 km || 
|-id=961 bgcolor=#E9E9E9
| 615961 ||  || — || November 3, 2004 || Kitt Peak || Spacewatch ||  || align=right | 2.2 km || 
|-id=962 bgcolor=#fefefe
| 615962 ||  || — || November 4, 2004 || Kitt Peak || Spacewatch || H || align=right data-sort-value="0.45" | 450 m || 
|-id=963 bgcolor=#E9E9E9
| 615963 ||  || — || November 4, 2004 || Kitt Peak || Spacewatch ||  || align=right data-sort-value="0.59" | 590 m || 
|-id=964 bgcolor=#d6d6d6
| 615964 ||  || — || November 10, 2004 || Kitt Peak || Spacewatch ||  || align=right | 2.3 km || 
|-id=965 bgcolor=#E9E9E9
| 615965 ||  || — || November 10, 2004 || Kitt Peak || Spacewatch ||  || align=right | 1.5 km || 
|-id=966 bgcolor=#fefefe
| 615966 ||  || — || November 11, 2004 || Kitt Peak || Spacewatch ||  || align=right data-sort-value="0.67" | 670 m || 
|-id=967 bgcolor=#E9E9E9
| 615967 ||  || — || November 9, 2004 || Mauna Kea || Mauna Kea Obs. ||  || align=right data-sort-value="0.76" | 760 m || 
|-id=968 bgcolor=#E9E9E9
| 615968 ||  || — || September 22, 2008 || Kitt Peak || Spacewatch ||  || align=right data-sort-value="0.56" | 560 m || 
|-id=969 bgcolor=#fefefe
| 615969 ||  || — || October 21, 2008 || Mount Lemmon || Mount Lemmon Survey ||  || align=right data-sort-value="0.84" | 840 m || 
|-id=970 bgcolor=#E9E9E9
| 615970 ||  || — || September 17, 2013 || Mount Lemmon || Mount Lemmon Survey ||  || align=right | 1.4 km || 
|-id=971 bgcolor=#d6d6d6
| 615971 ||  || — || October 15, 2004 || Mount Lemmon || Mount Lemmon Survey ||  || align=right | 2.0 km || 
|-id=972 bgcolor=#E9E9E9
| 615972 ||  || — || December 9, 2004 || Kitt Peak || Spacewatch ||  || align=right | 1.2 km || 
|-id=973 bgcolor=#E9E9E9
| 615973 ||  || — || December 9, 2004 || Kitt Peak || Spacewatch ||  || align=right | 1.2 km || 
|-id=974 bgcolor=#E9E9E9
| 615974 ||  || — || December 12, 2004 || Campo Imperatore || CINEOS ||  || align=right data-sort-value="0.76" | 760 m || 
|-id=975 bgcolor=#d6d6d6
| 615975 ||  || — || December 11, 2004 || Catalina || CSS ||  || align=right | 2.7 km || 
|-id=976 bgcolor=#E9E9E9
| 615976 ||  || — || December 11, 2004 || Catalina || CSS ||  || align=right | 1.4 km || 
|-id=977 bgcolor=#E9E9E9
| 615977 ||  || — || December 13, 2004 || Kitt Peak || Spacewatch ||  || align=right | 1.6 km || 
|-id=978 bgcolor=#E9E9E9
| 615978 ||  || — || December 15, 2004 || Kitt Peak || Spacewatch ||  || align=right | 1.4 km || 
|-id=979 bgcolor=#fefefe
| 615979 ||  || — || February 21, 2012 || Mount Lemmon || Mount Lemmon Survey ||  || align=right data-sort-value="0.58" | 580 m || 
|-id=980 bgcolor=#E9E9E9
| 615980 ||  || — || December 3, 2004 || Kitt Peak || Spacewatch ||  || align=right data-sort-value="0.69" | 690 m || 
|-id=981 bgcolor=#fefefe
| 615981 ||  || — || October 29, 2017 || Haleakala || Pan-STARRS || H || align=right data-sort-value="0.75" | 750 m || 
|-id=982 bgcolor=#E9E9E9
| 615982 ||  || — || January 16, 2009 || Mount Lemmon || Mount Lemmon Survey ||  || align=right data-sort-value="0.97" | 970 m || 
|-id=983 bgcolor=#E9E9E9
| 615983 ||  || — || October 20, 2012 || Mount Lemmon || Mount Lemmon Survey ||  || align=right data-sort-value="0.49" | 490 m || 
|-id=984 bgcolor=#E9E9E9
| 615984 ||  || — || December 2, 2008 || Kitt Peak || Spacewatch ||  || align=right data-sort-value="0.76" | 760 m || 
|-id=985 bgcolor=#E9E9E9
| 615985 ||  || — || December 11, 2004 || Kitt Peak || Spacewatch ||  || align=right data-sort-value="0.93" | 930 m || 
|-id=986 bgcolor=#fefefe
| 615986 ||  || — || November 4, 2004 || Kitt Peak || Spacewatch ||  || align=right data-sort-value="0.57" | 570 m || 
|-id=987 bgcolor=#fefefe
| 615987 ||  || — || November 11, 2004 || Kitt Peak || Spacewatch ||  || align=right data-sort-value="0.51" | 510 m || 
|-id=988 bgcolor=#d6d6d6
| 615988 ||  || — || December 18, 2004 || Mount Lemmon || Mount Lemmon Survey || 3:2 || align=right | 3.7 km || 
|-id=989 bgcolor=#FA8072
| 615989 ||  || — || November 18, 2014 || Mount Lemmon || Mount Lemmon Survey ||  || align=right data-sort-value="0.58" | 580 m || 
|-id=990 bgcolor=#E9E9E9
| 615990 ||  || — || December 20, 2004 || Mount Lemmon || Mount Lemmon Survey ||  || align=right data-sort-value="0.85" | 850 m || 
|-id=991 bgcolor=#fefefe
| 615991 ||  || — || January 6, 2005 || Catalina || CSS ||  || align=right data-sort-value="0.92" | 920 m || 
|-id=992 bgcolor=#fefefe
| 615992 ||  || — || January 15, 2005 || Kitt Peak || Spacewatch ||  || align=right data-sort-value="0.54" | 540 m || 
|-id=993 bgcolor=#d6d6d6
| 615993 ||  || — || January 13, 2005 || Kitt Peak || Spacewatch ||  || align=right | 2.6 km || 
|-id=994 bgcolor=#d6d6d6
| 615994 ||  || — || January 15, 2005 || Kitt Peak || Spacewatch ||  || align=right | 2.4 km || 
|-id=995 bgcolor=#d6d6d6
| 615995 ||  || — || January 13, 2005 || Kitt Peak || Spacewatch ||  || align=right | 2.0 km || 
|-id=996 bgcolor=#d6d6d6
| 615996 ||  || — || January 15, 2005 || Kitt Peak || Spacewatch ||  || align=right | 2.8 km || 
|-id=997 bgcolor=#fefefe
| 615997 ||  || — || October 31, 2013 || Mount Lemmon || Mount Lemmon Survey ||  || align=right data-sort-value="0.72" | 720 m || 
|-id=998 bgcolor=#d6d6d6
| 615998 ||  || — || April 28, 2011 || Haleakala || Pan-STARRS ||  || align=right | 2.3 km || 
|-id=999 bgcolor=#E9E9E9
| 615999 ||  || — || December 22, 2008 || Kitt Peak || Spacewatch ||  || align=right data-sort-value="0.84" | 840 m || 
|-id=000 bgcolor=#E9E9E9
| 616000 ||  || — || January 7, 2005 || Socorro || LINEAR ||  || align=right data-sort-value="0.94" | 940 m || 
|}

References

External links 
 Discovery Circumstances: Numbered Minor Planets (615001)–(620000) (IAU Minor Planet Center)

0615